The municipal history of Quebec started in 1796 with the creation of administrations for Montréal and Quebec City, but it really developed immediately prior to the creation of the Province of Canada in 1841 with the formation of municipal districts, followed in March 1845 when the Parliament of the Province of Canada adopted an Act to create local authorities in Lower Canada which took effect in July 1845.

The structure was abolished and replaced in September 1847 by a system of county municipalities, whose councillors were elected from the parishes and townships existing therein, with provision for the creation of towns and villages that would be separated from their counties. Further reform came into effect in July 1855 for all parts of Lower Canada other than Montreal, Quebec City and Saint-Hyacinthe, which included provision for the creation of local councils for parishes and townships, the representation of towns and villages on county councils, and the formation of towns and villages by order in council upon the recommendation of the relevant county council. The municipal law of Lower Canada was consolidated into a single Act in 1860.

For more than a century localities changed little. The major modifications were from the colonization of new territories. Until 2002 and 2006, there were no major reorganizations in the municipal history of Quebec, with the notable exceptions of Montréal (1910), Laval (1965), Bécancour (1965) Gaspé (1971), Mirabel (1971), Percé (1971), Grande-Rivière (1974), Buckingham (1975), Gatineau (1975), La Pêche (1975), Beauport (1976), La Malbaie (1999), Mont-Tremblant (2000), Chandler (2001), Saint-Jean-sur-Richelieu (2001) and Saint-Hyacinthe (2001).

Municipalities written in bold are on their current form.

1608 to 1793

1608 
3 July: Foundation of Quebec City.

1634 
4 July: Foundation of Trois-Rivières.

1642 
17 May: Foundation of Ville-Marie.

1793 
 Foundation of Sherbrooke.

19th century

1802 
17 May: Creation of Sherbrooke.

1832 
 1 January: Montréal and Quebec City became Cities.

1841 
 15 April: Creation of the Municipal Districts.

1845 
 1 July: Creation of 167 Municipalities, 115 Parishes and 39 Townships to replace the Municipal districts. See List of Municipalities created in Quebec in 1845.
 13 October: Creation of the Village of Montmagny from territories taken from the Parish of Saint-Thomas.
 3 November:
The Municipality of Baie-de-Gaspé is split into the Municipality of Baie-de-Gaspé-Nord and the Municipality of Baie-de-Gaspé-Sud.
The Municipality of Saint-François-de-Sales changed its name to Saint-François-de-Sales-Isle-Jésus.
 11 December: The Municipality of Saint-Raymond became the Parish of Saint-Raymond-Nonnat.

1846 
 7 January: The Municipality of Sault-au-Récollet became the Parish of La Visitation-du-Sault-au-Récollet.
 12 January: Creation of the Village of Philipsburg from territories taken from the Municipality of Philipsburg.
 9 February: The Municipality of Saint-Cuthbert became a Parish.
 25 February: The Municipality of Châteauguay became the Parish of Saint-Joachim-de-Châteauguay.
 17 March: The Municipality of Onslow is split into the Township of Eardly and the Township of Onslow.
 30 March: Creation of the Village of Laprairie-de-la-Magdeleine from territories taken from the Municipality of Laprairie.
 8 April: Creation of the Village of L'Assomption from territories taken from the Municipality of L'Assomption.
 18 May: The Municipality of Isles-de-la-Magdelaine changed its name to Isles-de-la-Magdeleine.
 1 July: 
The Municipality of Hochelaga is split into the Village of Côte-des-Neiges, the Village of Hochelaga, the Village of Saint-Henri, the Village of Saint-Pierre and the Village of Visitation.
The Municipality of Trois-Rivières is split into the Town of Trois-Rivières and the Suburb of Trois-Rivières.
 4 July: Creation of the Parish of Sainte-Gertrude from territories taken from the Parish of Bécancour and the Parish of Gentilly.
 23 July: The Municipality of Coteau-du-Lac became the Parish of Saint-Ignace-du-Coteau-du-Lac.
 24 July: Creation of the Municipality of Sainte-Brigide from territories taken from the Parish of Sainte-Marie-de-Monnoir.
 26 July: Creation of the Village of Beauharnois from territories taken from the Parish of Saint-Clément.
 14 October: Creation of the Village of La Côte-Saint-Louis from territories taken from the Village of Visitation.
 4 November: Creation of the Parish of Saint-Janvier-de-Blainville from territories taken from the Municipality of Saint-Jérôme.
 24 November: The Municipality of Arthabaska is split into the Municipality Saint-Christophe-d'Arthabaska and the Municipality of Saint-Norbert-d'Arthabaska.
 25 November: Creation of the Municipality of Sainte-Marthe from territories taken from the Municipality of Rigaud.
 23 December: Creation of the Village of Christieville from territories taken from the Parish of Saint-Athanase.

1847 
 6 February: Creation of the Village of Saint-Ours from territories taken from the Municipality of Saint-Ours.
 22 April: The Municipality of Tring is split into the Municipality of Lambton and the Township of Tring.
 7 May: 
The Municipality of Saint-Grégoire-le-Grand-de-Monnoir became the Parish of Saint-Grégoire-le-Grand.
The Municipality of Sainte-Brigide became the Parish of Sainte-Brigide-de-Monnoir.
 3 June: The Township of Stukely is split into the Municipality of North-Stukely and the Municipality of South-Stukely.
 20 July: Creation of the Village of Aylmer from territories taken from the Township of Hull.
 1 September: Parishes and Townships are merged into County municipalities.

1848 
 10 May: Creation of the Town of William-Henry from territories taken from the County of Richelieu.
 8 June: Creation of the Village of Varennes from territories taken from the County of Verchères.
 14 June: Creation of the Village of Longueuil from territories taken from the County of Chambly.
 20 July: Creation of the Village of Saint-Jean from territories taken from the County of Chambly.
 10 August: Creation of the Village of Saint-Eustache from territories taken from the County of Lac-des-Deux-Montagnes.
 24 August: Creation of the Village of Lachine from territories taken from the County of Montreal.
 9 October: Creation of the Village of Huntingdon from territories taken from the County of Beauharnois.
 26 October: Creation of the Village of Chambly from territories taken from the County of Chambly.

1849 
 30 May: Creation of the Municipality of Sainte-Anne-des-Monts from territories taken from the County of Gaspé.
 1 June: Creation of the Village of Saint-Thérèse-de-Blainville from territories taken from the County of Terrebonne.
 6 October: Creation of the Village of Saint-Hyacinthe from territories taken from the County of Saint-Hyacinthe.

1850 
 12 April: Creation of the Village of Saint-Michel-de-Vaudreuil from territories taken from the County of Vaudreuil.
 26 June: Creation of the Village of Fraserville from territories taken from the County of Rimouski.
 10 August: The Village of Saint-Hyacinthe became a Town.

1852 
 14 April: Creation of the Village of Berthier from territories taken from the County of Berthier.
 28 June: Creation of the Town of Sherbrooke from territories taken from the County of Sherbrooke.
 19 July: Creation of the Parish of Saint-Jérusalem-d’Argenteuil from territories taken from the County of Lac-des-Deux-Montagnes.
 1 December: Creation of the Village of Soulanges from territories taken from the County of Vaudreuil.

1853 
 9 November: Creation of the Village of Coteau-Landing from territories taken from the County of Vaudreuil.
 22 December: Creation of the Village of Terrebonne from territories taken from the County of Terrebonne.

1854 
 24 August: Creation of the Village of Saint-Joachim-de-la-Pointe-Claire from territories taken from the County of Montreal.

1855 
 13 February: Creation of the Village of Buckingham from territories taken from the County of Ottawa.
 21 February: Creation of the Village of Napierville from territories taken from the County of Huntingdon.
 19 April: Creation of the Village of Bassin-de-Chambly from territories taken from the County of Chambly.
 27 April: Creation of the Village of Plessisville from territories taken from the County of Mégantic.
 18 May: Creation of the Village of Sainte-Scholastique from territories taken from the County of Lac-des-Deux-Montagnes.
 1 July: Creation of 286 Parishes and 113 Townships from county municipalities. See List of municipalities created in Quebec in 1855.
 6 August: Creation of the Parish of Saint-Sauveur from territories taken from the Municipality of Saint-Jérôme and the Township of Abercrombie.
 13 September: Creation of the Parish of Saint-Raphaël from territories taken from the Parish of Saint-Michel and the Parish of Saint-Vallier.
 19 September: Creation of the Parish of Saint-Fidèle-de-Mont-Murray from territories taken from the Parish of Saint-Étienne-de-Murray-Bay.
 1 December: The Municipality of Metschermet changed its name to Linière.

1856 
 1 January: Creation of the Township of Chertsey.
 8 February: Creation of the Parish of Saint-Colomb-de-Sillery from territories taken from the Parish of Québec and the Parish of Saint-Foye.
 9 June: Creation of the Parish of Saint-Joseph from territories taken from the Municipality of Saint-Benoît and the Municipality of Saint-Eustache.
 19 June: The Township of Stoke is annexed by the Township of Windsor.
 1 July: Creation of the Village of Saint-Jérôme from territories taken from the Municipality of Saint-Jérôme.
 19 July: Creation of the Parish of Notre-Dame-du-Portage from territories taken from the Municipality of Rivière-du-Loup and the Parish of Saint-André.
 28 August:
Creation of the Parish of Saint-Frédéric-de-Beauce from territories taken from the Parish of Saint-Joseph-de-la-Beauce.
Creation of the Parish of Saint-Liboire from territories taken from the Municipality of Saint-Simon and the Parish of Saint-Dominique.
 15 September: The Village of Saint-Jean became a Town.
 11 December: 
The Municipality of Aubert-Gallion became the Parish of Saint-Georges.
Creation of the Parish of Saint-Antonin from territories taken from the Municipality of Rivière-du-Loup.
The Township of Whitworth became the Parish of Saint-Modeste.

1857 
 1 January: 
Creation of the Municipality of Lac-Saint-Jean.
Creation of the Village of Boucherville from territories taken from the Parish of Boucherville.
The Village of Napierville is annexed by the Parish of Saint-Cyprien.
Creation of the Village of Princeville from territories taken from the Township of Stanfold.
Creation of the Village of Saint-Lin from territories taken from the Parish of Saint-Lin-de-Lachenaye.
Creation of the Village of Stanstead Plain from territories taken from the Township of Stanstead.
 15 January: 
The Municipality of Saint-Jacques-le-Mineur became a Parish.
Creation of the Parish of Sainte-Agathe from territories taken from the Parish of Saint-Gilles.
 20 February: Creation of the Parish of Saint-Paul-l’Ermite from territories taken from the Parish of Repentigny.
 12 March: The Municipality of Sainte-Marthe became a Parish.
 9 June: Creation of the Parish of Saint-Canut from territories taken from the Municipality of Saint-Colomban and the Municipality of Sainte-Scholastique.
 10 June: 
The Town of Saint-Hyacinthe became a City.
Creation of the Village of Saint-Césaire from territories taken from the Municipality of Saint-Césaire.
 1 July: 
The Town of Trois-Rivières became a City.
Creation of the Municipality of Saint-Aubert from territories taken from the Municipality of Port-Joli.
Creation of the Municipality of Saint-Lambert from territories taken from the Parish of Longueuil.
Creation of the Township of Franklin from territories taken from the Municipality of Russeltown, the Township of Hemmingford and the Township of Hinchinbrooke.
 17 October: Creation of the Parish of Saint-Robert from territories taken from the Municipality of Sorel, the Parish of Saint-Aimé and the Parish of Sainte-Victoire.

1858 
 1 January:
The Municipality of Grantham is split into the Municipality of Grantham-Wendover-et-Simpson and the Parish of Saint-Germain.
Creation of the Municipality of Low from territories taken from the Township of Wakefield.
The Municipality of Sainte-Julie-de-Somerset became the Township of Somerset-Nord.
Creation of the Village of Kamouraska from territories taken from the Parish of Kamouraska.
Creation of the Village of Sainte-Rose from territories taken from the Parish of Sainte-Rose-de-Lima.
The Parish of Saint-Calixte-de-Somerset became the Township of Somerset-Sud.
The Township of Halifax is split into the Township of Halifax-Nord and the Township of Halifax-Sud.
The Township of Ireland became the Municipality of Ireland-et-Coleraine.
The Township of Winslow is split into the Municipality of Winslow-Nord and the Municipality of Winslow-Sud.
 1 March: The Township of Horton is annexed by the Township of Bulstrode.
 31 May: The Municipality of Saint-Bazile became the Parish of Saint-Basile.
 5 August: The Municipality of Russeltown became the Parish of Saint-Jean-Chrysostome.
 16 August: 
Creation of the Village of Arthabaskaville from territories taken from the Parish of Saint-Christophe-d’Arthabaska.
Creation of the Village of Fermont from territories taken from the Parish of Saint-Maurice.
Creation of the Village of Marieville from territories taken from the Parish of Sainte-Marie-de-Monnoir.
Creation of the Township of Westbury from territories taken from the Township of Ascot.
 21 August: The Municipality of Ormstown became the Parish of Saint-Malachie-d’Ormstown.

1859 
 1 January:
Creation of the Village of Granby from territories taken from the Township of Granby.
Creation of the Township of Chester-Est from territories taken from the Parish of Saint-Norbert-d’Arthabaska.
Creation of the Township of Chester-Ouest from territories taken from the Parish of Saint-Norbert-d’Arthabaska and the Township of Tingwick.
Creation of the Township of MacNider from territories taken from the Municipality of Métis.
Creation of the Township of Saint-Jean.
 8 March: Creation of the Parish of Saint-Justin from territories taken from the Municipality of Maskinongé.
 16 March: Creation of the Parish of Notre-Dame-du-Mont-Carmel from territories taken from the Parish of Cap-de-la-Magdeleine and the Parish of Saint-Maurice.
 14 April: Creation of the Parish of Saint-Étienne from territories taken from the Parish of Trois-Rivières.
 3 May: The Municipality of Bienheureux-Alphonse-de-Rodriguez became the Parish of Bienheureux-Alphonse-Rodriguez.
 4 May:
The Municipality of Bagot is split into the Municipality of Bagotville-Partie-Nord-Ouest-du-Township-de-Bagot and the Municipality of Grande-Baie.
The Municipality of Lac-Saint-Jean is split into the Municipality of Hébertville and the Municipality of Roberval.
The Village of Christieville became the Town of Iberville.
 8 May: Creation of the Parish of Saint-Anaclet-de-Lessard from territories taken from the Parish of Saint-Germain-de-Rimouski and the Parish of Sainte-Luce.
 13 May: Creation of the Parish of Saint-Onésime-d’Ixworth from territories taken from the Municipality of Sainte-Anne-de-la-Pocatière.
 4 June: Creation of the Parish of Saint-Roch-de-Richelieu from territories taken from the Municipality of Saint-Ours.
 19 August: 
The Municipality of Saint-Jean-Baptiste became the Parish of Saint-Jean-Baptiste-de-Rouville.
Creation of the Parish of Sainte-Angélique from territories taken from the Municipality of La Petite-Nation.
 23 October: Creation of the Village of Saint-Rémi from territories taken from the Parish of Saint-Rémi.

1860 
 1 January: 
The Municipality of Low became a Township.
Creation of the Village of Danville from territories taken from the Township of Shipton.
Creation of the Village of Melbourne from territories taken from the Township of Melbourne.
Creation of the Village of Sainte-Geneviève from territories taken from the Parish of Sainte-Geneviève.
The Parish of Isle-aux-Grues changed its name to Saint-Antoine-de-l'Isle-aux-Grues.
Creation of the Township of Buckland.
Creation of the Township of Saint-Camille from territories taken from the Township of Wotton.
Creation of the Township of Wexford.
Creation of the United Townships of Garthby-et-Stratford from territories taken from the Municipality of Dudswell.
 11 February: The Municipality of Saint-Simon became a Parish.
 19 March: Creation of the Parish of Saint-Alban-d’Alton from territories taken from the Municipality of Deschambault.
 19 May:
The Town of William-Henry changed its name to Sorel.
The Village of Terrebonne became a Town.
 8 June: Creation of the Parish of Saint-Antoine-Abbé from territories taken from the Township of Franklin.
 24 September: Creation of the Parish of Saint-Étienne-de-Lauzon from territories taken from the Parish of Saint-Bernard and the Parish of Saint-Nicolas.
 29 November: The Municipality of Lacolle became the Parish of Saint-Bernard-de-Lacolle.
 11 December:
The Municipality of Métis became the Parish of Saint-Octave-de-Métis.
Creation of the Parish of Sainte-Louise from territories taken from the Municipality of Saint-Roch-des-Aulnets.
 31 December: Creation of the Municipality of Saint-Hubert from territories taken from the Parish of Longueuil.

1861 
 1 January: 
The Municipality of Buckingham is split into the Township of Buckingham and the Township of Portland.
Creation of the Municipality of Notre-Dame-des-Anges-de-Stanbridge from territories taken from the Parish of Saint-Georges.
Creation of the Village of Acton Vale from territories taken from the Township of Acton.
Creation of the Township of Armagh from territories taken from the Parish of Saint-François-de-Sales-de-la-Rivière-du-Sud.
Creation of the Township of Hunterstown from territories taken from the Parish of Saint-Paulin.
Creation of the Township of Ripon.
The Township of Windsor is split into the Municipality of Saint-Georges-de-Windsor and the Municipality of Windsor-et-Stoke.
 18 May:
Creation of the Town of Lévis from territories taken from the Parish of Notre-Dame-de-la-Victoire.
The Municipality of L'Assomption became a Parish.
The Municipality of Lachenaie became the Parish of Saint-Charles-de-Lachenaie.
The Municipality of Saint-Césaire became a Parish.
The Municipality of Saint-Sulpice became a Parish.
The Municipality of Sorel became a Parish.
Creation of the Municipality of Whitton from territories taken from the Municipality of Bury.
Creation of the Village of Saint-Jean-Baptiste from territories taken from the Village of La Côte-Saint-Louis.
Creation of the Village of Victoriaville from territories taken from the Parish of Saint-Christophe-d’Arthabaska.
Creation of the Parish of Saint-Hyacinthe-le-Confesseur from territories taken from the Parish of Saint-Hyacinthe.
Creation of the Parish of Saint-Sévère from territories taken from the Municipality of Yamachiche.
 6 July: The Municipality of Viger became a Township.
 13 August: Creation of the Township of Denonville from territories taken from the Municipality of Isle-Verte.

1862 
 1 January:
The Municipality of Blandford became the Parish of Saint-Louis-de-Blandford.
Creation of the Municipality of Chemins-Elgin-et-Taché.
The Municipality of Valcartier is split into the Municipality of Saint-Gabriel-de-Valcartier and the Municipality of Saint-Gabriel-Ouest.
Creation of the Village of Farnham-Ouest from territories taken from the Township of Farnham-Ouest.
Creation of the Township of Aylwin.
The Township of Bulstrode became the Parish of Saint-Valère-de-Bulstrode.
Creation of the Township of Montminy.
 9 June: Creation of the Municipality of Saint-Roch-de-Québec-Nord from territories taken from the Parish of Saint-Roch.
 1 July: Creation of the Municipality of L'Avenir from territories taken from the Municipality of Durham and the Township of Wickham.

1863 
 1 January: 
Creation of the Village of Bienville from territories taken from the Parish of Notre-Dame-de-la-Victoire.
Creation of the Village of Côte-des-Neiges and the Village of Hochelaga from territories taken from the Parish of Montreal.
Creation of the Village of La Rochelle from territories taken from the Parish of Saint-Grégoire-le-Grand.
Creation of the Village of Richmond from territories taken from the Township of Cleveland.
Creation of the Village of Roxton Falls from territories taken from the Township of Roxton.
Creation of the Parish of Saint-Édouard-de-Lotbinière from territories taken from the Municipality of Lotbinière.
Creation of the Parish of Sainte-Agathe from territories taken from the Parish of Sainte-Adèle.
Creation of the Parish of Sainte-Emmélie-de-Lotbinière from territories taken from the Municipality of Lotbinière and the Parish of Saint-Jean-Deschaillons.
Creation of the Township of Shenley from territories taken from the Municipality of Linière.
 17 January: 
The Municipality of Saint-Hubert became a Parish.
Creation of the Parish of Sainte-Flore from territories taken from the Parish of Cap-de-la-Magdeleine.
 18 February: Creation of the Parish of Notre-Dame-de-Portneuf from territories taken from the Municipality of Cap-Santé and the Municipality of Deschambault.
 12 March: Creation of the Village of Chicoutimi from territories taken from the Municipality of Chicoutimi.
 1 April: Creation of the Township of Havelock from territories taken from the Township of Hemmingford.
 5 May: 
Creation of the Municipality of Escoumains.
Creation of the Municipality of Tadoussac.
 11 July: Creation of the Parish of Saint-Tite from territories taken from the Parish of Saint-Stanislas-de-la-Rivière-des-Envies and the Parish of Sainte-Anne-de-la-Pérade.
 20 July: The Municipality of Abbotsford became the Parish of Saint-Paul.
 27 August: Creation of the Parish of Saint-Didace from territories taken from the Parish of Saint-Gabriel-de-Brandon.
 15 October: The Village of Beauharnois became a Town.

1864 
 1 January: 
Creation of the Town of Joliette from territories taken from the Parish of Saint-Charles-Borrommée-du-Village-d’Industrie.
The Municipality of Grantham-Wendover-et-Simpson is split into the Township of Grantham and the United Townships of Wendover-et-Simpson.
The Municipality of Warwick is split into the Parish of Saint-Albert-de-Warwick and the Township of Warwick.
The Municipality of Windsor-et-Stoke is split into the Township of Stoke and the Township of Windsor.
Creation of the Village of Coaticook from territories taken from the Township of Barnston.
Creation of the Village of New-Glasgow from territories taken from the Municipality of Lacorne.
Creation of the Parish of Sainte-Clothilde-de-Horton.
The Township of Acton is split into the Parish of Saint-André-d'Acton and the Parish of Saint-Théodore-d'Acton.
Creation of the Township of Ely-Nord from territories taken from the Township of Ely.
Creation of the Township of Saint-Valérien-de-Milton from territories taken from the Township of Roxton and the dissolved Township of Milton.
Creation of the Township of Sainte-Cécile-de-Milton from territories taken from the Township of Granby, the Township of Roxton and the dissolved Township of Milton.
The Township of Milton is therefore dissolved and its territory is split between the newly formed Township of Saint-Valérien-de-Milton and the newly formed Township of Sainte-Cécile-de-Milton.
The Township of Tingwick is split into the Municipality of Chénier and the Municipality of Tingwick.
The Township of Tring is split into the Municipality of Saint-Éphrem-de-Tring and the Municipality of Saint-Victor-de-Tring.
Creation of the Township of Wright.
The United Townships of Ham is split into the Township of Ham-Nord and the Township of Ham-Sud.
 11 May: Creation of the Parish of Sainte-Béatrix from territories taken from the Municipality of Sainte-Mélanie.
 30 June: Creation of the Parish of Sainte-Marguerite-du-Lac-Masson from territories taken from the Township of Wexford.
 1 July: 
The Municipality of Aston is split into the Municipality of Saint-Léonard, the Municipality of Saint-Wenceslas, the Municipality of Sainte-Eulalie and a section of the Municipality of Saint-Célestin.
Creation of the Municipality of Saint-Célestin from territories taken from the Parish of Saint-Grégoire-le-Grand and a section of the dissolved Municipality of Aston.
 1 August: Creation of the Parish of Saint-Malachy from territories taken from the Township of Lochaber.

1865 
 1 January:
Creation of the Municipality of Chutes-de-Kingsey from territories taken from the Municipality of Kingsey and the Township of Warwick.
Creation of the Municipality of Durham-Sud from territories taken from the Municipality of Durham and the Parish of Saint-André-d'Acton.
Creation of the Township of Bégon from territories taken from the Municipality of Trois-Pistoles.
Creation of the United Townships of Hartwell-et-Suffolk.
 19 January: Creation of the Parish of Saint-Luc from territories taken from the Parish of Champlain.
 17 February: Creation of the Parish of Saint-Sébastien from territories taken from the Parish of Saint-Georges.
 15 March: Creation of the Parish of Sainte-Angèle from territories taken from the Parish of Sainte-Marie-de-Monnoir.
 18 August: Creation of the Parish of Saint-Mathieu-de-Rioux from territories taken from the Municipality of Saint-Simon-de-la-Baie-Ha! Ha!.
 18 September: The Village of Berthier became a Town.

1866 
 1 January: Creation of the Municipality of Grand-Méchin from territories taken from the Municipality of Matane.
 20 February: Creation of the Parish of Saint-Pacôme from territories taken from the Municipality of Rivière-Ouelle.
 15 August: 
Creation of the Municipality of York from territories taken from the Municipality of Baie-de-Gaspé-Sud.
The Village of Saint-Ours became a Town.

1867 
 1 January: 
The Municipality of Upton is split into the Parish of Saint-Bonaventure and the Parish of Saint-Guillaume.
Creation of the Municipality of Saint-Étienne-de-Beauharnois from territories taken from the Parish of Saint-Clément and the Parish of Saint-Louis-de-Gonzague.
Creation of the Municipality of Wickham-Ouest from territories taken from the Township of Wickham.
Creation of the Village of Dunham from territories taken from the Township of Dunham.
Creation of the Village of Frelighsburg from territories taken from the Parish of Saint-Armand-Est.
Creation of the Village of Lauzon from territories taken from the Parish of Pointe-Lévi.
Creation of the Village of Warwick from territories taken from the Township of Warwick.
Creation of the Village of Waterloo from territories taken from the Township of Shefford.
Creation of the Township of Cameron and the Township of Northfield.
Creation of the Township of Mailloux from territories taken from the Township of Buckland.
 8 May: Creation of the Parish of Saint-Agapit-de-Beaurivage from territories taken from the Parish of Saint-Apollinaire and the Parish of Saint-Gilles.
 1 July: Creation of the Township of Bouchette.

1868 
 13 January: Creation of the Parish of Sainte-Jeanne-de-Neuville from territories taken from the Municipality of Cap-Santé, the Municipality of Pointe-aux-Trembles, the Parish of Saint-Basile and the Parish of Sainte-Catherine.
 24 February: 
The Municipality of Saint-Cyrille became the Parish of Saint-Cyrille-de-Lessard.
The Township of Percé is split into the Municipality of Anse-du-Cap and the Municipality of Percé.

1869 
 1 January:
Creation of the Village of Richelieu from territories taken from the Parish of Saint-Mathias.
Creation of the Village of Saint-Georges-de-Kakouna from territories taken from the Municipality of Kakonna.
Creation of the Parish of Saint-Eugène-de-l'Islet from territories taken from the Municipality of Islet.
 15 February: Creation of the Parish of Notre-Dame-de-Bon-Secours from territories taken from the Parish of Saint-Mathias and the Parish of Sainte-Marie-de-Monnoir.
 10 March: Creation of the Parish of Saint-Donat from territories taken from the Parish of Sainte-Luce.
 16 March: The Municipality of Mont-Carmel became the Parish of Notre-Dame-du-Mont-Carmel.
 18 March: Creation of the Parish of Sainte-Angèle-de-Mérici from territories taken from the Parish of Saint-Octave-de-Métis and the Parish of Sainte-Flavie.
 5 April: Creation of the Town of Saint-Germain-de-Rimouski from territories taken from the Parish of Saint-Germain-de-Rimouski.
 1 June: Creation of the Parish of Saint-Ulric from territories taken from the Municipality of Matane.
 23 July: Creation of the Parish of Saint-Siméon from territories taken from the Parish of Saint-Étienne-de-Murray-Bay.
 9 August: Creation of the Parish of Sainte-Dorothée from territories taken from the Parish of Saint-Martin and the Parish of Sainte-Rose-de-Lima.
 26 October: The Municipality of Saint-Étienne-de-Beauharnois became the Parish of Saint-Étienne.

1870 
 1 January: 
Creation of the Village of Canrobert from territories taken from the Parish of Saint-Ange-Gardien.
Creation of the Township of Langevin.
Creation of the United Townships of Mulgrave-et-Derry.
The United Townships of Newport-Ditton-Chesham-Clinton-et-Aukland are split into the Township of Auckland and the United Townships of Newport-Ditton-Chesham-et-Clinton.
 1 February: The Township of Cap-Rosier is split into the Municipality of Anse-aux-Griffons and the Municipality of Cap-des-Rosiers.
 1 March: The Township of Forsyth became the Municipality of Saint-Évariste-de-Forsyth.
 25 June: Creation of the Parish of Sainte-Félicité from territories taken from the Municipality of Matane.
 8 September: Creation of the Parish of Sainte-Angèle-de-Laval from territories taken from the Parish of Bécancour and the Parish of Saint-Grégoire-le-Grand.
 24 December:
Creation of the Municipality of Chester-Nord from territories taken from the Township of Chester-Est.
The Parish of Montreal changed its name to Notre-Dame.
The Parish of Sorel changed its name to Saint-Pierre-de-Sorel.

1871 
 1 January: 
Creation of the Village of La Côte-la-Visitation from territories taken from the Parish of Notre-Dame.
Creation of the Village of Lennoxville from territories taken from the Township of Ascot.
Creation of the United Townships of Egan-et-Kensington.
 20 March: Creation of the Parish of Saint-Damien from territories taken from the Parish of Saint-Gabriel-de-Brandon.
 20 May: Creation of the Parish of Notre-Dame-du-Lac.
 15 June: Creation of the Parish of Saint-Basile-le-Grand from territories taken from the Parish of Saint-Bruno-de-Montarville and the Parish of Saint-Joseph-de-Chambly.

1872 
 1 January: 
The Parish of Saint-Roch changed its name to Saint-Sauveur.
Creation of the Township of Hincks.
 31 January: Creation of the Parish of Sainte-Monique from territories taken from the Parish of Saint-Augustin, the Parish of Saint-Canut, the Parish of Saint-Janvier-de-Blainville, the Parish of Sainte-Scholastique and the Parish of Sainte-Thérèse-de-Blainville.
 11 March: Creation of the Parish of Saint-Félix-du-Cap-Rouge from territories taken from the Parish of Ancienne-Lorette and the Parish of Saint-Foye.
 6 June: Creation of the Parish of Saint-Patrice-de-Beaurivage from territories taken from the Parish of Saint-Gilles  and the Parish of Saint-Sylvestre-de-Beaurivage.
 24 August: The Municipality of Saint-André-Avellin became a Parish.
 11 September: Creation of the Parish of Sainte-Marie-de-Blandford from territories taken from the Parish of Sainte-Gertrude.
 29 October: Creation of the Parish of Saint-Fortunat-de-Wolfestown from territories taken from the Township of Wolfestown.
 24 December:
Creation of the Municipality of Saint-Tite-des-Caps from territories taken from the Parish of Saint-Joachim.
The Village of Lachine became a Town.

1873 
 1 January:
Creation of the Village of Beebe Plain from territories taken from the Township of Stanstead.
Creation of the Village of Napierville from territories taken from the Parish of Saint-Cyprien.
Creation of the Parish of Saint-Côme.
Creation of the Parish of Saint-François-Xavier from territories taken from the Parish of Saint-Modeste and the Township of Viger.
Creation of the Parish of Saint-Fulgence from territories taken from the Municipality of Bagotville-Partie-Nord-Ouest-du-Township-de-Bagot and the Township of Tremblay.
Creation of the Parish of Saint-Jérôme from territories taken from the Municipality of Hébertville and the Municipality of Roberval.
Creation of the Parish of Saint-Louis-de-Métabetchouan from territories taken from the Municipality of Roberval.
Creation of the Parish of Saint-Pierre-de-la-Pointe-aux-Esquimaux.
Creation of the Parish of Saint-Prime from territories taken from the Municipality of Roberval.
Creation of the Parish of Saint-Ubalde from territories taken from the Parish of Saint-Casimir.
The Township of Denonville became the Parish of Saint-Paul-de-la-Croix.
Creation of the Township of Ireland-Nord from territories taken from the Municipality of Ireland-et-Coleraine.
 1 February: Creation of the Town of Nicolet from territories taken from the Parish of Saint-Jean-Baptiste-de-Nicolet.
 29 September: Creation of the Parish of Saint-Joseph-de-Lepage from territories taken from the Parish of Sainte-Flavie.
 6 December: Creation of the Parish of Sainte-Françoise from territories taken from the Municipality of Trois-Pistoles.
 9 December: Creation of the Village of Gaspé from territories taken from the Municipality of Baie-de-Gaspé-Sud.
 23 December: Creation of the Parish of Saint-Léon-de-Standon and the Parish of Sainte-Germaine-du-Lac-Etchemin.

1874 
 1 January: 
Creation of the Municipality of Clifton from territories taken from the Township of Clifton.
The Municipality of Whitton is split into the Township of Hampden, the Township of Marston and the Township of Whitton.
Creation of the Village of Dixville from territories taken from the Township of Barford.
Creation of the Village of Leclercville from territories taken from the Parish of Sainte-Emmélie-de-Lotbinière.
Creation of the Village of Notre-Dame-de-Grâce from territories taken from the Parish of Notre-Dame.
Creation of the Township of Doncaster.
Creation of the Township of Partie-Ouest-du-Canton-d’Inverness from territories taken from the Municipality of Inverness.
The United Townships of Garthby-et-Stratford are split into the Township of Garthby and the Township of Stratford.
 28 January: The Village of Fraserville became a Town.
 12 February: The Village of Longueuil became a Town.
 23 April: Creation of the Parish of Saint-Malachie-de-Frampton from territories taken from the Township of Frampton and other unorganized territories.
 1 May: Creation of the Parish of Saint-Narcisse-de-Beaurivage from territories taken from the Parish of Saint-Bernard, the Parish of Saint-Gilles, the Parish of Saint-Lambert-de-Lauzon and the Parish of Saint-Patrice-de-Beaurivage.
 14 July: Creation of the Parish of Saint-Louis-du-Ha! Ha!

1875 
1 January: 
Creation of the Town of Salaberry-de-Valleyfield from territories taken from the Parish of Sainte-Cécile.
The Municipality of Broughton is split into the Township of Broughton and the Township of Thetford.
Creation of the Municipality of Hull from territories taken from the Township of Hull.
The Municipality of Isles-de-la-Magdeleine is split into the Municipality of Étang-du-Nord, the Municipality of Havre-Aubert and the Municipality of Havre-aux-Maisons.
Creation of the Village of Côte-Saint-Paul, the Village of La Rivière-Saint-Pierre and the Village of Saint-Gabriel from territories taken from the Parish of Notre-Dame.
Creation of the Village of Drummondville from territories taken from the Township of Grantham.
Creation of the Village of Quyon from territories taken from the Township of Onslow.
Creation of the Village of Sweetsburgh from territories taken from the Township of Dunham.
Creation of the Parish of Saint-Charles-de-Caplan from territories taken from the Township of Hamilton and the Township of New Richmond.
Creation of the Parish of Sainte-Thècle from territories taken from the Parish of Saint-Stanislas-de-la-Rivière-des-Envies.
Creation of the United Townships of Roux-Bellechasse-et-Daaquam.
11 February: Creation of the Parish of Sainte-Brigitte-de-Laval from territories taken from the Parish of Ange-Gardien and the Parish of Château-Richer.
23 February:
Creation of the City of Hull from the entire Township of Hull and territories taken from the Municipality of Hull and from the Township of Templeton.
Creation of the Town of Saint-Henri and the Village of Outre-Mont from territories taken from the Parish of Notre-Dame.
Creation of the Parish of Sainte-Pudentienne.
 20 April: Creation of the Parish of Annonciation from territories taken from the Parish of Saint-Joseph.
 23 April: Creation of the Parish of Sainte-Sophie-de-Lévrard from territories taken from the Parish of Saint-Pierre-les-Becquets.
 29 July: Creation of the Parish of Saint-Joseph from territories taken from the Parish of Saint-Pierre-de-Sorel.
 24 December: The Town of Sherbrooke became a City.
 29 December: 
Creation of the Parish of Saint-Lazare from territories taken from the Municipality of Vaudreuil.
Creation of the Parish of Saint-Philippe-de-Néri.

1876 
 1 January: 
Creation of the Municipality of Onslow from territories taken from the Township of Onslow.
Creation of the Municipality of Pabos from territories taken from the Municipality of Newport.
Creation of the Village of Cowansville from territories taken from the Township of Dunham.
Creation of the Village of Grenville from territories taken from the Township of Grenville.
Creation of the Village of La Pointe-à-Gatineau from territories taken from the Township of Templeton.
Creation of the Village of Waterville from territories taken from the Township of Compton.
Creation of the Village of Windsor-Mills from territories taken from the Township of Windsor.
Creation of the United Township of Bigelow-Wells-Blake-et-McGill.
The United Townships of Newport-Ditton-Chesham-et-Clinton are split into the Township of Newport and the United Townships of Ditton-Chesham-et-Clinton.
 13 January: Creation of the Parish of Saint-David-de-l’Aube-Rivière from territories taken from the Parish of Notre-Dame-de-la-Victoire.
 1 February: Creation of the Village of Bagotville from territories taken from the Municipality of Bagotville-Partie-Nord-Ouest-du-Township-de-Bagot.
 26 April: Creation of the Parish of Saint-Telesphore from territories taken from the Parish of Notre-Dame-de-la-Victoire.
 17 July: Creation of the Parish of Notre-Dame-du-Sacré-Cœur from territories taken from the Parish of Saint-Germain-de-Rimouski.
 27 December: The United Townships of Ditton-Chesham-et-Clinton are split into the Township of Chesham and the United Townships of Ditton-et-Clinton.
 28 December: 
The Village of Farnham-Ouest became the Town of Farnham.
The Village of La Rivière-Saint-Pierre changed its name to Verdun.
Creation of the Village of Notre-Dame-de-Grâce-Ouest from territories taken from the Village of Notre-Dame-de-Grâce.
Creation of the Village of Pointe-au-Pic from territories taken from the Parish of Saint-Étienne-de-Murray-Bay.
Creation of the Village of Sainte-Cunégonde from territories taken from the Town of Saint-Henri.
The Township of Bolton is split into the Municipality of Bolton-Est and the Municipality of Bolton-Ouest.
The Township of Malbay is split into the Parish of Saint-Pierre-de-la-Malbaie-Numéro-Un and the Parish of Saint-Pierre-de-la-Malbaie-Numéro-Deux.

1877 
 1 January: 
Création of the Municipality of Méchins from territories taken from the Municipality of Grand-Méchin.
Création of the Village of Como from territories taken from the Municipality of Vaudreuil.
Creation of the Parish of Ange-Gardien from territories taken from the Township of Buckingham.
Creation of the Parish of Saint-Gabriel.
 1 February: The Township of Cox is split into the Municipality of New Carlisle and the Municipality of Paspébiac.
 19 April: Creation of the Parish of Saint-Télesphore from territories taken from the Municipality of Nouvelle-Longueuil.
 21 April: Creation of the Parish of Saint-Alexis from territories taken from the Township of Hunterstown.
 14 May: Creation of the Parish of Sainte-Anne from territories taken from the Parish of Saint-Pierre-de-Sorel.
 12 December: Creation of the Township of Aumond.

1878 
 1 January:
The Municipality of Méchins became the United Townships of Dalibaire-et-Romieu.
Creation of the Municipality of Saint-Pierre-de-Broughton from territories taken from the Township of Broughton.
Creation of the Village of Hemmingford from territories taken from the Township of Hemmingford.
Creation of the Village of Upton from territories taken from the Parish of Saint-Éphrem-d’Upton.
Creation of the Parish of Saint-Moïse from territories taken from the Parish of Saint-Octave-de-Métis and the Township of MacNider.
Creation of the Township of Aldfield from territories taken from the Township of Onslow.
Creation of the United Townships of Arundel-et-Desalaberry from territories taken from the Township of Harrington.
 9 March: 
Creation of the Village of Saint-Louis-du-Mile-End from territories taken from the Village of La Côte-Saint-Louis.
Creation of the Parish of Côte-Saint-Paul from territories taken from the Village of Côte-Saint-Paul and the Parish of Notre-Dame.
 18 April: Creation of the Village of Sainte-Anne-de-Bellevue from territories taken from the Municipality of Bout-de-l'Isle.
 24 July: Creation of the Parish of Sainte-Théodosie from territories taken from the Municipality of Verchères.
 7 August: Creation of the Village of La-Rivière-du-Loup from territories taken from the Municipality of Rivière-du-Loup-en-Haut.

1879 
 1 January:
Creation of the Municipality of Saint-Joseph-d’Alma from territories taken from the Municipality of Hébertville and other unorganized territories.
Creation of the Township of Emberton from territories taken from the Parish of Eaton.
Creation of the Village of Montebello from territories taken from the Municipality of La Petite-Nation.
The Township of Ham-Sud is split into the Municipality of Sud-Ouest-du-Canton-de-Ham and the Parish of Saint-Joseph-de-Ham-Sud.
 2 April: Creation of the Municipality of Partie-Ouest-du-Canton-de-Douglas from territories taken from the Township of Douglas.
 13 August: Creation of the Parish of Sainte-Marie-Madeleine from territories taken from the Parish of La Présentation, the Parish of Saint-Charles, the Parish of Saint-Damase, the Parish of Saint-Hilaire, the Parish of Saint-Hyacinthe and the Parish of Saint-Jean-Baptiste-de-Rouville.
 31 October: 
Creation of the Municipality of Saint-Eugène-de-Grantham from territories taken from the Parish of Saint-Germain and the Parish of Sainte-Hélène.
The Village of Chicoutimi became a Town.
The Village of Notre-Dame-de-Grâce changed its name to Côte-Saint-Antoine.

1880 
 1 January: 
Creation of the Municipality of Hull from territories taken from the Municipality of Hull.
The Village of La-Rivière-du-Loup became the Town of Louiseville.
Creation of the Township of Marston-Sud from territories taken from the Township of Marston.
Creation of the Township of Tessier from territories taken from the Municipality of Matane.
The United Townships of Ditton-et-Clinton became the Township of Ditton.
 28 August: Creation of the Village of Pointe-Fortune and the Village of Rigaud from territories taken from the Municipality of Rigaud.
 30 October: Creation of the Village of Mont-Joli from territories taken from the Parish of Sainte-Flavie.
 29 December: Creation of the Parish of Des Saints-Anges from territories taken from the Parish of Saint-Joseph-de-la-Beauce and the Parish of Sainte-Marie-de-la-Nouvelle-Beauce.
 30 December: Creation of the Parish of Très-Saint-Rédempteur from territories taken from the Municipality of Rigaud and the Parish of Sainte-Marthe.

1881 
 1 January: 
Creation of the Township of Armand from territories taken from the Parish of Saint-Modeste.
Creation of the Township of Wolfe.
The United Townships of Arundel-et-Desalaberry are split into the Township of Arundel and the United Townships of DeSalaberry-et-Grandison.
The United Townships of Egan-et-Kensington are split into the Township of Egan and the Township of Kensington.
The United Townships of Hartwell-et-Suffolk are split into the Township of Hartwell and the Township of Suffolk.
 26 March: Creation of the Village of Notre-Dame-d’Hébertville from territories taken from the Municipality of Hébertville.

1882 
 1 January: 
Creation of the Municipality of Est-du-Township-de-Tingwick from territories taken from the Municipality of Chénier and the Municipality of Tingwick.
Creation of the Municipality of Saint-Félicien from territories taken from the Parish of Saint-Prime.
Creation of the Township of Clyde.
Creation of the Township of Partie-Est-du-Township-de-Leeds from territories taken from the Township of Leeds.
Creation of the United Townships of Spaulding-and-Ditchfield from territories taken from the Municipality of Linière.
 8 March: Creation of the Township of Ponsonboy.
 1 May: Creation of the Parish of Sainte-Philomène-de-Fortierville from territories taken from the Parish of Saint-Jean-Deschaillons.
 27 May: 
The Village of Richmond became a Town.
Creation of the Parish of Notre-Dame-des-Anges-de-Montauban from territories taken from the Parish of Saint-Ubalde.
 10 October: Creation of the Parish of Sainte-Anne-de-la-Pointe-au-Père from territories taken from the Parish of Saint-Germain-de-Rimouski and the Parish of Sainte-Luce.

1883 
 1 January:
Creation of the Municipality of D'Israëli from territories taken from the Township of Garthby and the Township of Stratford.
Creation of the Municipality of Sainte-Anastasie-de-Nelson from territories taken from the Township of Nelson.
Creation of the Parish of Notre-Dame-de-Laterrière and the Parish of Saint-Dominique-de-Jonquières from territories taken from the Municipality of Chicoutimi.
Creation of the Parish of Sainte-Barbe from territories taken from the Municipality of Saint-Anicet.
Creation of the Township of Hocquart from territories taken from the Parish of Saint-Éloi.
Creation of the Township of Howard.
Creation of the Township of Joly.
 22 February: The Township of Port-Daniel is split into the Municipality of Partie-Est-du-Township-de-Port-Daniel and the Municipality of Partie-Ouest-du-Township-de-Port-Daniel.
 30 March:
The Municipality of La Petite-Nation became the Parish of Notre-Dame-de-Bonsecours.
The Village of Hochelaga became the Town of Hochélaga.
The Village of Montmagny became a Town.
The Village of Saint-Lin became the Town of Laurentides.
 5 September: Creation of the Village of Roberval from territories taken from the Municipality of Roberval.
 27 December: The Town of Hochélaga became the Town of Maisonneuve.

1884 
 1 January:
The Municipality of Est-du-Township-de-Tingwick became the Parish of Saint-Rémi-de-Tingwick.
The Village of Coaticook became a Town.
Creation of the Parish of Sainte-Blandine from territories taken from the Parish of Saint-Germain-de-Rimouski.
The Township of Hamilton became the Parish of Saint-Bonaventure-de-Hamilton.
 10 January: Creation of the Township of Gayhurst from territories taken from the Municipality of Linière.
 10 June:
Creation of the Municipality of Saint-Maxime-du-Mont-Louis from territories taken from the Municipality of Sainte-Anne-des-Monts.
The Village of Saint-Jean-Baptiste became a Town.
The Village of Sainte-Cunégonde became a Town.
The Parish of Notre-Dame is annexed by the Village of Notre-Dame-de-Grâce-Ouest.
Creation of the Parish of Saint-Joachim-de-Shefford.
Creation of the Parish of Sainte-Émélie-de-l'Énergie from territories taken from the Parish of Saint-Côme and the Parish of Saint-Jean-de-Matha.

1885 
 1 January:
Creation of the Municipality of Saint-Norbert-du-Cap-Chatte from territories takem from the Municipality of Sainte-Anne-des-Monts.
Creation of the Parish of Notre-Dame-Auxiliatrice-de-Buckland from territories taken from the Township of Buckland and the Township of Mailloux.
Creation of the Parish of Saint-Clément from territories taken from the Township of Bégon and the Township of Hocquart.
Creation of the Parish of Saint-Michel-des-Saints.
Creation of the Township of Cloridorme.
Creation of the United Townships of Bowman-et-Villeneuve.
 9 January: Creation of the Village of Megantic from territories taken from the Township of Whitton.
 2 April:
Creation of the Parish of Sainte-Clothilde from territories taken from the Parish of Saint-Jean-Chrysostome.
Creation of the Parish of Très-Saint-Sacrement from territories taken from the Parish of Saint-Jean-Chrysostome, the Parish of Saint-Malachie-d’Ormstown and the Parish of Sainte-Martine.
 9 May: Creation of the Town of Lachute from territories taken from the Parish of Saint-Jérusalem-d’Argenteuil.
 19 June: Creation of the Parish of Saint-Valérien from territories taken from the Parish of Sainte-Cécile-du-Bic.
 10 August: Creation of the Parish of Saint-Jacques-des-Piles from territories taken from the Parish of Saint-Stanislas-de-la-Rivière-des-Envies, the Parish of Sainte-Flore and other unorganized territories.
 9 September: Creation of the Township of Bourget.
 24 September: Creation of the Parish of Sainte-Rose-du-Dégelé.
 3 October: The Township of Thetford is split into the Municipality of Nord-du-Canton-de-Thetford and the Municipality of Sud-du-Canton-de-Thetford.
 31 October: Creation of the Township of Metgermette-Nord from territories taken from the Municipality of Linière.
 31 December: Creation of the Parish of Saint-Damase from territories taken from the Township of MacNider.

1886 
 1 January: 
Creation of the Municipality of Saint-Bruno from territories taken from the Municipality of Hébertville.
Creation of the Municipality of Saint-Méthode from territories taken from the Municipality of Saint-Félicien.
The Township of Suffolk became the United Townships of Suffolk-et-Addington.
 12 January: Creation of the Village of Sainte-Pudentienne from territories taken from the Parish of Sainte-Pudentienne.
 15 January: The Town of Saint-Jean-Baptiste is annexed by the City of Montréal.
 16 January: Creation of the Village of Thurso from territories taken from the Township of Lochaber.
 7 Avril: Creation of the Parish of Saint-Léonard-de-Port-Maurice from territories taken from the Parish of La Visitation-du Sault-au-Récollet and the Parish of Longue-Pointe.
 21 June: 
Creation of the Village of Lac-Weedon from territories taken from the Township of Weedon.
The Parish of Lachine changed its name to Saints-Anges-de-Lachine.
The Township of Templeton is split into the Municipality of Templeton-Est and the Municipality of Templeton-Ouest.
 30 June: Creation of the Parish of Saint-Mathieu from territories taken from the Township of Shawenegan.
 9 December: Creation of the Municipality of Marchand.

1887 
 1 January: 
The Village of Saint-Gabriel is annexed by the City of Montréal.
Creation of the Township of Woodbridge.
 20 January: Creation of the Parish of Saint-Michel-de-Rougemont from territories taken from the Parish of Saint-Césaire, the Parish of Saint-Damase and the Parish of Saint-Hyacinthe.
 10 February: 
Creation of the Village of Rivière-Beaudette from territories taken from the Parish of Saint-Zotique.
Creation of the Village of Station-du-Coteau from territories taken from the Municipality of Nouvelle-Longueuil.
 14 February: Creation of the Village of Saint-Polycarpe from territories taken from the Municipality of Nouvelle-Longueuil.
 9 March: Creation of the Township of Amherst.
 29 March: Creation of the Parish of Saint-Nérée from territories taken from the Parish of Saint-Gervais-et-Saint-Protais, the Parish of Saint-Lazare and the Parish of Saint-Raphaël.
 5 April: Creation of the Village of Yamachiche from territories taken from the Municipality of Yamachiche.
 18 May: 
Creation of the Village of Weedon-Centre from territories taken from the Township of Weedon.
Creation of the Parish of Sainte-Elizabeth-de-Warwick from territories taken from the Municipality of Chutes-de-Kingsey and the Township of Warwick.
 20 September: Creation of the Village of Carillon from territories taken from the Municipality of Argenteuil.
 26 September:
The Township of Partie-Ouest-du-Canton-d’Inverness became the Parish of Saint-Pierre-Baptiste.
Creation of the Township of Watford West from territories taken from the Township of Cranbourne and other unorganized territories.
 21 July: The Parish of Saint-Sauveur became the Village of Saint-Sauveur-de-Québec.
 9 December: Creation of the Parish of Saint-Gédéon from territories taken from the Municipality of Hébertville.
 28 December: 
Creation of the Parish of Saint-François-Xavier-de-Brompton from territories taken from the Township of Brompton.
Creation of the Parish of Saint-Sylvère from territories taken from the Parish of Sainte-Gertrude.

1888 
 1 January: 
The Village of L'Assomption became a Town.
The Township of Buckland is closed and dissolved.
 21 January: The Municipality of Chemins-Elgin-et-Taché is split into the Municipality of Saint-Pamphile and the Municipality of Sainte-Perpétue.
 26 January: Creation of the Municipality of Adstock from territories taken from the Municipality of Saint-Éphrem-de-Tring.
 28 January: Creation of the Village of Magog from territories taken from the Township of Magog.
 1 March: Creation of the Parish of Sainte-Anne-de-Sabrevois from territories taken from the Parish of Saint-Athanase and the Parish of Saint-Georges.
 14 May: Creation of the Municipality of Saint-François-de-Sales from territories taken from the Municipality of Saint-Louis-de-Métabetchouan.
 15 May: Creation of the Municipality of Shenley-Dorset-Jersey-et-Marlow from territories taken from the Municipality of Linière and the Parish of Saint-Georges.
 6 July: Creation of the Village of Knowlton from territories taken from the Township of Brome.
 12 July: The Village of Drummondville became a Town.
 10 December: Creation of the Village of Eastman from territories taken from the Municipality of Bolton-Est.
 26 December: Creation of the Village of Shefford-Ouest from territories taken from the Township of Shefford.

1889 
 22 February: Creation of the Village of New-Rockland from territories taken from the Township of Melbourne.
 21 March:
The Municipality of Notre-Dame-des-Anges-de-Stanbridge became the Parish of Notre-Dame-de-Stanbridge.
Creation of the Municipality of Stanbridge Station and the Parish of Saint-Ignace-de-Stanbridge from territories taken from the Township of Stanbridge.
The Village of Côte-des-Neiges is split into the Town of Notre-Dame-des-Neiges and the Village of Notre-Dame-des-Neiges-Ouest.
Creation of the Parish of Sainte-Anne-du-Sault.
 1 July: The Town of Sorel became a City.
 12 September: Creation of the Municipality of Hull from territories taken from the Municipality of Hull.
 19 September: Creation of the Municipality of Whitton from territories taken from the Township of Whitton.
 27 September: The Village of Saint-Sauveur-de-Québec is annexed by Quebec City.
 3 October: Creation of the Village of Saint-Joseph from territories taken from the Parish of Saint-Joseph-de-la-Beauce.
 18 December: Creation of the Village of Ormstown from territories taken from the Parish of Saint-Malachie-d’Ormstown.

1890 
 30 January: The Municipality of Saint-Antoine became the Parish of Saint-Antoine-de-Padoue.
 2 April: 
Creation of the Town of Bedford from territories taken from the Township of Stanbridge.
The Town of Sainte-Cunégonde became the City of Sainte-Cunégonde-de-Montréal.
The Village of Acton-Vale became the Town of Acton.
The Village of Buckingham became a Town.
The Village of Côte-Saint-Antoine became a Town.
The Village of La Côte-Saint-Louis became the Town of Côte-Saint-Louis.
The Village of Magog became a Town.
The Village of Victoriaville is split into the Town of Victoriaville and the Parish of Sainte-Victoire-d’Arthabaska.
 11 April: Creation of the Parish of Saint-Séverin from territories taken from the Parish of Saint-Stanislas-de-la-Rivière-des-Envies and the Parish of Saint-Tite.
 18 April: Creation of the United Townships of Normandin-et-d’Albanel from territories taken from the Municipality of Saint-Félicien.
 20 May: Creation of the Parish of Saint-Benoît-Joseph-Labre.
 10 June: Creation of the Township of Delisle.
 18 August: Creation of the Parish of Saint-Pierre-du-Lac.
 20 December: Creation of the Parish of Saint-Damien-de-Buckland.
 30 December: 
The Village of Aylmer became a Town.
The Village of Waterloo became a Town.
Creation of the Parish of Saint-Alphonse from territories taken from the Township of Farnham-Est and the Township of Granby.
The Township of Armagh became the Parish of Saint-Cajetan-d’Armagh.

1891 
 20 April: Creation of the Township of Lochaber from territories taken from the Township of Lochaber.
 1 June: Creation of the Village of Dorion from territories taken from the Municipality of Vaudreuil.
 2 July: Creation of the Parish of Saint-Adelphe from territories taken from the Parish of Saint-Stanislas-de-la-Rivière-des-Envies.
 11 November: The Municipality of Ireland-et-Coleraine is split into the Parish of Saint-Désiré-du-Lac-Noir and the Township of Ireland-Sud.
 28 December: Creation of the Village of Deschaillons from territories taken from the Parish of Saint-Jean-Deschaillons.

1892 
 1 January: The Township of Mailloux became the Parish of Saint-Philémon.
 27 January:
The Township of Cranbourne became the Parish of Saint-Odilon-de-Cranbourne.
The Township of Frampton became the Parish of Saint-Édouard-de-Frampton.
The Township of Langevin became the Parish of Sainte-Justine.
 1 April: Creation of the Municipality of Wakefield from territories taken from the Township of Wakefield.
 22 April: The Parish of Saint-François-Xavier is dissolved and its territory is split between the Parish of Saint-Modeste and the Township of Viger.
 19 May: Creation of the Village of Rock Island from territories taken from the Township of Stanstead.
 24 June: 
Creation of the Town of Cookshire from territories taken from the Municipality of Eaton.
Creation of the Town of Scotstown from territories taken from the Township of Hampden and the Township of Lingwick.
Creation of the Village of Dorval from territories taken from the Parish of Saints-Anges-de-Lachine.
Creation of the Parish of Saint-Côme-de-Kennebec from territories taken from the Municipality of Linière.
 16 August: The Municipality of Saint-Lambert became a Village.
 3 September: Creation of the Village of Sawyerville from territories taken from the Municipality of Eaton.
 22 September: Creation of the Village of Kingsville from territories taken from the Municipality of Sud-du-Canton-de-Thetford, the Parish of Saint-Désiré-du-Lac-Noir and the Township of Ireland-Nord.
 26 October: The Municipality of Marchand became a Township.
 19 November: Creation of the Municipality of Grosse-Île from territories taken from the Municipality of Havre-aux-Maisons.
 17 December: Creation of the Village of Saint-Gabriel-de-Brandon from territories taken from the Parish of Saint-Gabriel-de-Brandon.

1893 
 7 February: Creation of the Township of Lochaber from territories taken from the Township of Lochaber.
 27 February: The Municipality of Saint-Roch-de-Québec-Nord is split into the Municipality of Limoilou and the Municipality of Saint-Malo.
 25 March: Creation of the Village of Baie-Saint-Paul from territories taken from the Parish of Baie-Saint-Paul.
 1 April: Creation of the Village of Saint-Jérôme-de-Matane from territories taken from the Municipality of Matane.
 27 April: Creation of the Parish of Saint-Gilbert from territories taken from the Municipality of Deschambault.
 12 June: Creation of the Village of Compton from territories taken from the Township of Compton.
 24 June: Creation of the Town of Saint-Laurent from territories taken from the Parish of Saint-Laurent.
 29 June: Creation of the Parish of Saint-Germain from territories taken from the Parish of Kamouraska, the Parish of Saint-André, the Parish of Saint-Paschal-de-Kamouraska and the Parish of Sainte-Hélène.
 23 August: Creation of the Parish of Saint-Thomas-d’Aquin from territories taken from the Parish of La Présentation and the Parish of Saint-Hyacinthe.
 3 November: Creation of the Municipality of Saint-Thomas-d’Aquin from territories taken from the Municipality of Saint-François-de-Sales.
 5 December: Creation of the Village of Sainte-Anne-de-Chicoutimi from territories taken from the Township of Tremblay.
 19 December: The Town of Côte-Saint-Louis is annexed by the City of Montréal.

1894 
 1 January: 
Creation of the Village of Saint-Pierre-aux-Liens from territories taken from the Village of Notre-Dame-de-Grâces-Ouest.
The Township of Hartwell became the United Townships of Hartwell-et-Preston.
 4 January: Creation of the Parish of Saint-Hubert.
 8 January: 
The Town of Saint-Henri became a City.
The Village of Côte-Saint-Paul became a Town.
Creation of the Parish of Saint-Nazaire-d’Acton from territories taken from the Municipality of Wickham-Ouest, the Parish of Saint-Éphrem-d’Upton, the Parish of Saint-Germain and the Parish of Saint-Théodore-d’Acton.
Creation of the Parish of Sainte-Christine from territories taken from the Municipality of Durham-Sud and the Parish of Saint-André-d'Acton.
 26 January: Creation of the United Townships of Wabassee-Dudley-et-Bouthillier.
 20 March: The Township of Viger became the Parish of Saint-Épiphane.
 29 June: The Municipality of Adstock became the Parish of Saint-Méthode-d’Adstock.
 13 July: Creation of the Parish of Saint-Théophile-de-la-Beauce from territories taken from the Municipality of Linière and the Municipality of Shenley-Dorset-Jersey-et-Marlow.
 18 December: Creation of the Municipality of Notre-Dame-du-Rosaire from territories taken from the Township of Ashburton and the Township of Montminy.

1895 
 12 January: 
The Town of Côte-Saint-Antoine changed its name to Westmount.
Creation of the Town of Summerlea from territories taken from the Parish of Saints-Anges-de-Lachine.
The Village of La Côte-la-Visitation is split into the Village of Lorimier and the Village of Petite-Côte.
The Village of Outre-Mont became the Town of Outremont.
The Village of Sainte-Anne-de-Bellevue became a Town.
Creation of the Village of Senneville from territories taken from the Municipality of Bout-de-l’Isle.
 4 February: The Village of Saint-Jérôme became a Town.
 13 March: Creation of the Municipality of Saint-Alban-du-Cap-des-Rosiers from territories taken from the Municipality of Anse-aux-Griffons and the Municipality of Cap-des-Rosiers.
 25 March: Creation of the Parish of Saint-Théophile from territories taken from the Parish of Notre-Dame-du-Mont-Carmel and the Parish of Saint-Jacques-des-Piles.
 1 April: Creation of the Parish of Sainte-Marie-de-Sayabec.
 22 April: Creation of the Village of Agnès from territories taken from the United Townships of Spaulding and Ditchfield.
 11 July: Creation of the Parish of La Présentation-de-la-Sainte-Vierge from territories taken from the Parish of Saint-Laurent and the Parish of Saints-Anges-de-Lachine.
 7 October: Creation of the Parish of Saint-Zénon.
 31 October: Creation of the Village of Marbleton from territories taken from the Municipality of Dudswell.
 21 December: 
The Village of Saint-Louis-du-Mile-End became the Town of Saint-Louis.
Creation of the Township of Sainte-Edwidge-de-Clifton from territories taken from the Township of Clifton.

1896 
 18 March: Creation of the Village of Malbaie from territories taken from the Parish of Saint-Étienne-de-Murray-Bay.
 10 April: Creation of the Parish of Sainte-Christine.
 15 June: Creation of the Township of Loranger.
 7 July: 
Creation of the Village of Kingsbury from territories taken from the Township of Melbourne.
Creation of the Village of Sainte-Agathe-des-Monts from territories taken from the Parish of Sainte-Agathe.
 30 September:
Creation of the Village of Papineauville from territories taken from the Parish of Sainte-Angélique.
Creation of the Village of Villeray from territories taken from the Parish of La Visitation-du-Sault-au-Récollet.
 25 November: 
Creation of the Village of Annaville from territories taken from the Municipality of Saint-Célestin.
Creation of the Village of Sutton from territories taken from the Township of Sutton.
 17 December: Creation of the Village of Beaulac from territories taken from the Township of Garthby.
 24 December: Creation of the Municipality of Saint-Michel-de-Mistassini from territories taken from the Municipality of Saint-Méthode and other unorganized territories.

1897 
 9 January: 
The Town of Côte-Saint-Paul changed its name to Saint-Paul.
Creation of the Town of Montreal-Ouest from territories taken from the Village of Notre-Dame-de-Grâces-Ouest.
Creation of the Village of Petit-Métis from territories taken from the Parish of Saint-Octave-de-Métis and the Township of MacNider.
Creation of the Parish of Saint-Maxime from territories taken from the Parish of Saint-Bernard, the Parish of Saint-Isidore-de-Lauzon and the Parish of Sainte-Marie-de-la-Nouvelle-Beauce.
Creation of the Parish of Saint-Michel-Archange from territories taken from the Municipality of Beauport and the Municipality of Limoilou.
 21 January: Creation of the Village of Ahuntsic from territories taken from the Parish of La Visitation-du-Sault-au-Récollet.
 11 February: Creation of the Parish of Saint-Ignace-de-Loyola from territories taken from the Parish of L’Isle-du-Pads.
 24 March: Creation of the Village of Masson from territories taken from the Township of Buckingham.
 10 June: Creation of the Village of Saint-Éphrem-de-Tring from territories taken from the Municipality of Saint-Éphrem-de-Tring.
 29 July: Creation of the Township of Bergeronnes from territories taken from the Municipality of Escoumains.
 2 October: Creation of the Parish of Saint-Jacques-le-Majeur-de-Causapscal.
 7 October: Creation of the Parish of Saint-Cléophas from territories taken from the Municipality of Saint-Félix-de-Valois.
 11 October: Creation of the Township of Bois.
 25 October: Creation of the Village of North Hatley from territories taken from the Township of Hatley.
 11 November: Creation of the Township of Kénogami.
 17 November: Creation of the Municipality of Sainte-Rose-de-Watford from territories taken from the Parish of Sainte-Justine.

1898 
 1 January: Creation of the United Townships of Robertson-et-Pope.
 3 January: Creation of the Township of Kiamika.
 15 January: 
Creation of the Village of Grand-Mère from territories taken from the Parish of Sainte-Flore.
The Village of Saint-Lambert became a Town.
Creation of the Parish of Notre-Dame-du-Bon-Conseil.
 14 February: Creation of the Parish of Saint-Thuribe from territories taken from the Parish of Saint-Casimir.
 21 February: Creation of the Village of Saint-Raymond from territories taken from the Parish of Saint-Raymond-Nonnat.
 24 February: Creation of the Village of Saint-Benoît from territories taken from the Municipality of Saint-Benoît.
 21 March: Creation of the Village of Saint-Joseph-de-Bordeaux from territories taken from the Parish of La Visitation-du-Sault-au-Récollet.
 30 March: Creation of the Village of Beaurivage-de-la-Longue-Pointe from territories taken from the Parish of Longue-Pointe.
 22 April: Creation of the Village of Bernierville from territories taken from the Township of Halifax-Sud.
 29 April: Creation of the Village of Saint-Jérôme from territories taken from the Parish of Saint-Jérôme.
 2 June: Creation of the Township of Saint-Paul-de-Mille-Vaches from territories taken from the Municipality of Escoumains.
 23 September: Creation of the Parish of Saint-Jean-de-Dieu from territories taken from the Parish of Longue-Pointe.
 26 September: Creation of the Village of Saint-Joseph from territories taken from the Parish of Saint-Hyacinthe-le-Confesseur.
 7 October: Creation of the Parish of Notre-Dame-de-Lourdes-de-Ham from territories taken from the Township of Ham-Nord.
 9 November: Creation of the Township of Ashford.
 18 November: Creation of the Parish of Saint-Paul-de-l'Île-aux-Noix from territories taken from the Parish of Saint-Valentin.

1899 
 1 January: Creation of the Parish of Saint-Jean-des-Piles from territories taken from the Parish of Saint-Jacques-des-Piles.
 21 January: Creation of the Village of Asbestos from territories taken from the Township of Shipton.
 10 March:
The Village of Windsor-Mills became a Town.
Creation of the Parish of Saint-Élie-d’Orford from territories taken from the Township of Orford.
 28 March: Creation of the Municipality of Ascot Corner from territories taken from the Township of Ascot, the Township of Eaton, the Township of Stoke and the Township of Westbury.
 24 April: Creation of the Parish of Saint-Rémi.
 22 July: Creation of the Parish of Saint-Léonard-de-Port-Maurice from territories taken from the Parish of Saint-Raymond-Nonnat.
 3 October: Creation of the Township of Albanel from territories taken from the United Townships of Normandin-et-d’Albanel.
 10 October: Creation of the Village of Tadoussac from territories taken from the Municipality of Tadoussac.
 28 December: Creation of the Village of La Providence from territories taken from the Parish of Saint-Hyacinthe.

20th century

1900 
 8 January: Creation of the Township of Campbell.
 13 January: Creation of the United Townships of Woburn-et-Louise from territories taken from the Municipality of Linière.
 9 March: Creation of the Parish of L’Enfant-Jésus from territories taken from the Parish of Saint-Joseph-de-la-Beauce and the Parish of Sainte-Marie-de-la-Nouvelle-Beauce.
 10 April: Creation of the Village of Gentilly from territories taken from the Parish of Saint-Edouard-de-Gentilly.
 11 April: The Municipality of Linière is split into the Township of Marlow and the United Townships of Risborough-et-Marlow.
 27 July: Creation of the Village of Inverness from territories taken from the Municipality of Inverness.
 31 October: Creation of the Parish of Cœur-Très-Pur-de-la-Bienheureuse-Vierge-Marie-de-Plaisance from territories taken from the Parish of Sainte-Angélique.

1901 
 16 January: Creation of the United Townships of Wurtele-Moreau-et-Gravel.
 21 January: Creation of the Parish of Saint-Louis-de-Pintendre from territories taken from the Parish of Notre-Dame-de-la-Victoire, the Parish of Pointe-Lévi and the Parish of Saint-Henri.
 18 March: Creation of the Parish of Saint-Jacques-de-Parisville from territories taken from the Parish of Saint-Jean-Deschaillons.
 22 March: Creation of the Parish of Sainte-Germaine-de-l’Anse-aux-Gascons from territories taken from the Municipality of Partie-Est-du-Township-de-Port-Daniel.
 28 March: 
Creation of the Municiaplity of Sainte-Catherine-de-Hatley from territories taken from the Township of Hatley.
The Village of Grand-Mère became a Town.
 18 April: Creation of the Village of Shawinigan-Falls from territories taken from the Parish of Sainte-Flore and the Township of Shawenegan.
 13 July:
The Parish of Saint-Jean-Deschaillons is annexed by the Village of Deschaillons.
Creation of the Parish of Saint-Majorique-de-Grantham from territories taken from the Township of Grantham.
 23 July: Creation of the Municipality of Saint-André.
 2 October: Creation of the Village of Villers from territories taken from the Parish of Saint-Edouard-de-Gentilly.
 13 November: Creation of the Village of Daveluyville from territories taken from the Parish of Sainte-Anne-du-Sault.

1902 
 11 January: Creation of the Township of Maddington from territories taken from the Parish of Sainte-Anne-du-Sault.
 19 March: Creation of the Village of Saint-Guillaume from territories taken from the Parish of Saint-Guillaume.
 26 March: 
The Municipality of Saint-Malo is split into the Municipality of Petite-Rivière and the Village of Saint-Malo.
The Village of Shawinigan-Falls became a Town.
 18 April: Creation of the Village of Montmorency from territories taken from the Municipality of Beauport.
 30 April: Creation of the Village of Contrecoeur from territories taken from the Municipality of Contrecoeur.
 9 May: Creation of the Municipality of Musselyville from territories taken from the Parish of Saint-Bonaventure-de-Hamilton and the Township of New Richmond.
 28 May: Creation of the Village of Labelle from territories taken from the Township of Joly.
 10 June: Creation of the Village of Saint-Chrysostome from territories taken from the Parish of Saint-Jean-Chrysostome.
 12 September: Creation of the United Townships of Sainte-Anne-de-Portneuf from territories taken from the Township of Saint-Paul-de-Mille-Vaches.
 3 October: Creation of the Parish of Notre-Dame-de-la-Paix from territories taken from the Parish of Notre-Dame-de-Bonsecours and the Parish of Saint-André-Avellin.
 13 October: The Parish of Côte-Saint-Paul became the Village of Boulevard-Saint-Paul.
 20 October: Creation of the Municipality of Saint-Ambroise from territories taken from the Township of Bourget.
 22 October: Creation of the Village of Brompton-Falls from territories taken from the Township of Brompton.
 5 December: The Township of Broughton became the Parish of Sacré-Cœur-de-Jésus.
 19 December: Creation of the Village of Laurierville from territories taken from the Township of Somerset-Nord.

1903 
 15 January: Creation of the Municipality of Saint-Amédée from territories taken from the Municipality of Saint-Michel-de-Mistassini.
 22 January: Creation of the Village of Chénéville from territories taken from the United Townships of Hartwell-et-Preston.
 18 February: Creation of the Village of Hébertville-Station from territories taken from the Municipality of Hébertville.
 25 March: Creation of the Village of Massueville from territories taken from the Parish of Saint-Aimé.
 25 April: 
Creation of the Municipality of Saint-Herménégilde from territories taken from the Township of Barford and the Township of Hereford.
The Village of Arthabaskaville became the Town of Arthabaska.
The Village of Brompton-Falls became the Town of Bromptonville.
Creation of the Village of Côte-Saint-Luc from territories taken from the Village of Notre-Dame-de-Grâce-Ouest.
The Village of Roberval became a Town.
 9 May: Creation of the Township of Pohénégamook.
 29 May: Creation of the Village of Andréville from territories taken from the Parish of Saint-André.
 29 June: Creation of the Parish of Notre-Dame-du-Perpétuel-Secours-de-Charny from territories taken from the Parish of Saint-Jean-Chrysostome.
 1 July: The Village of Dorval became a Town.
 12 August:
Creation of the Municipality of Saint-Edmond from territories taken from the Parish of Saint-Benoît-Joseph-Labre.
Creation of the Municipality of Saint-Henri-de-Taillon.
Creation of the Municipality of Saint-Léon-le-Grand.
 22 October: Creation of the Village of Chesterville from territories taken from the Township of Chester-Ouest.
 4 November: Creation of the Municipality of Saint-Firmin from territories taken from the Municipality of Tadoussac.
 26 November: 
Creation of the Municipality of Saint-Hubert-de-Spaulding from territories taken from the United Townships of Spaulding and Ditchfield.
Creation of the Village of Saint-Denis from territories taken from the Parish of Saint-Denis.
 9 December: Creation of the Village of Beloeil from territories taken from the Parish of Saint-Mathieu de Beloeil.

1904 
 4 January: Creation of the Parish of Saint-Louis from territories taken from the Parish of Saint-Maurice.
 15 January: Creation of the Village of Saint-Pie from territories taken from the Parish of Saint-Pie.
 1 February: Creation of the Township of Turgeon.
 19 February: Creation of the Township of Lussier.
 1 March: The Township of Tessier became the Parish of Saint-Luc.
 15 March: Creation of the Township of Maniwaki.
 6 April: Creation of the Parish of Courcelles from territories taken from the Municipality of Lambton, the Municipality of Saint-Évariste-de-Forsyth and the Township of Aylmer.
 13 April: Creation of the Parish of Saint-Timothée from territories taken from the Parish of Saint-Jacques-des-Piles, the Parish of Saint-Narcisse and the Parish of Saint-Tite.
 20 April: Creation of the Municipality of Saint-Charles-de-Mandeville from territories taken from the Parish of Saint-Didace.
 25 April: Creation of the Village of Sainte-Geneviève-de-Pierrefonds from territories taken from the Village of Sainte-Geneviève.
 6 May: Creation of the Village of Pontgravé from territories taken from the Municipality of Chénier.
 31 May: The Town of Salaberry-de-Valleyfield became a City.
 2 June: Creation of the Town of Beauceville from territories taken from the Parish of Saint-François.
 15 June: Creation of the Village of Saint-Ambroise from territories taken from the Parish of Saint-Ambroise.
 5 July: Creation of the Township of Arago from territories taken from the Parish of Saint-Cyrille-de-Lessard.
 13 July: Creation of the Township of Letellier.
 17 August: 
Creation of the Village of Saint-Dominique-de-Jonquière from territories taken from the Parish of Saint-Dominique-de-Jonquières.
Creation of the Parish of Très-Précieux-Sang-de-Notre-Seigneur from territories taken from the Municipality of Saint-Célestin, the Parish of Bécancour and the Parish of Saint-Grégoire-le-Grand.
 10 September: Creation of the Parish of Saint-Elzéar-de-Laval from territories taken from the Municipality of Saint-Vincent-de-Paul, the Parish of Saint-Martin and the Parish of Sainte-Rose-de-Lima.
 15 September: Creation of the Village of Nominingue from territories taken from the Township of Loranger.
 19 November: Creation of the Village of D'Israëli from territories taken from the Municipality of D'Israëli.

1905 
 1 January: Creation of the Municipality of Gayhurst from territories taken from the Township of Gayhurst.
 17 February: Creation of the Village of Gracefield from territories taken from the Township of Wright.
 20 March: Creation of the Municipality of Partie-Est-du-Canton-de-Stukely-Nord from territories taken from the Township of North Stukely.
 20 April: Creation of the Village of Lawrenceville from territories taken from the Township of North Stukely.
 22 April: Creation of the Village of Saint-Jean-Baptiste-de-la-Pointe-aux-Trembles from territories taken from the Parish of Pointe-aux-Trembles.
 20 May:
The Village of Kingsville became the Town of Thetford Mines.
The Village of Marieville became a Town.
The Village of Petite-Côte changed its name to Rosemont.
 11 July: Creation of the Village of Saint-Félicien from territories taken from the Municipality of Saint-Félicien.
 6 September: Creation of the Village of Saint-Cyrille from territories taken from the United Townships of Wendover-et-Simpson.
 11 September: The Village of Villeray is annexed by the City of Montréal.
 23 September: Creation of the Township of Taché from territories taken from the Township of Bourget.
 30 October: The City of Saint-Henri is annexed by the City of Montréal.
 2 November: Creation of the Parish of Saint-Roch-de-Mékinac from territories taken from the Parish of Saint-Jacques-des-Piles, the Parish of Saint-Jean-des-Piles and other unorganized territories.
 4 November: Creation of the Parish of Saint-Laurent-de-Matapédia from territoires taken from the Township of Matapédia.
 25 November: Creation of the Village of Lac-au-Saumon from territories taken from the Municipality of Saint-Edmond.
 4 December: The City of Sainte-Cunégonde-de-Montréal is annexed by the City of Montréal.

1906 
 9 January: Creation of the Village of Montréal-Sud from territories taken from the Parish of Longueuil.
 16 January: Creation of the Municipality of Portland from territories taken from the Township of Portland.
 23 January: Creation of the Parish of Saint-Gérard-Magella from territories taken from the Parish of L'Assomption.
 9 March:
The Village of Notre-Dame-de-Grâces-Ouest became the Town of Notre-Dame-de-Grâces.
The Village of Saint-Joseph-de-Bordeaux changed its name to Bordeaux.
Creation of the Parish of Saint-Nazaire-de-Dorchester from territories taken from the Parish of Saint-Léon-de-Standon and the Parish of Saint-Malachie-de-Frampton.
 15 March: Creation of the Village of Cartier-Ville from territories taken from the Parish of Saint-Laurent.
 16 March: Creation of the Parish of Saint-Félicien-Partie-Nord-Ouest from territories taken from the Municipality of Saint-Félicien.
 11 May: Creation of the Village of Sainte-Anne-de-Beaupré from territories taken from the Parish of Sainte-Anne-Côte-Beaupré.
 13 June: The Parish of Sainte-Anne-Côte-Beaupré is annexed by the Village of Sainte-Anne-de-Beaupré.
 30 June: Creation of the Municipality of Partie-Sud-Est-du-Canton-de-Restigouche from territories taken from the Township of Ristigouche.
 2 October: Creation of the Village of Saint-Moïse from territories taken from the Parish of Saint-Moïse.
 10 October: Creation of the Township of Dorion.
 13 November: Creation of the Village of Laurier from territories taken from the Parish of Saint-Paul-l’Ermite.
 19 November: Creation of the Village of Lac-Noir from territories taken from the Parish of Saint-Désiré-du-Lac-Noir.
 28 November: Creation of the Village of Saint-Benoît-Joseph-Labre from territories taken from the Parish of Saint-Benoît-Joseph-Labre.

1907 
 6 March: Creation of the Township of Montcalm from territories taken from the Township of Harrington.
 14 March: 
Creation of the Town of Mégantic by the merger of the Village of Agnès and the Village of Mégantic.
The Village of Bordeaux became a Town.
The Village of Verdun became a Town.
The Parish of Longue-Pointe is split into the Town of Longue-Pointe and the Village of Tétreaultville-de-Montréal.
 21 March: The Village of Notre-Dame-des-Neiges-Ouest became the Town of Côte-des-Neiges.
 26 March: Creation of the Parish of Saint-Fabien-de-Panet from territories taken from the Township of Montminy and the Township of Talon.
 19 April: The Village of Laurier changed its name to Charlemagne.
 26 April: Creation of the Parish of Saint-Léon-de-Marston.
 1 May: Creation of the Village of Saint-Joseph from territories taken from the Parish of Saint-Joseph.
 20 July: Creation of the Municipality of Est-du-Canton-Armagh from territories taken from the Parish of Saint-Cajetan-d’Armagh.
 2 August: Creation of the Parish of Saint-Mathias-de-Cabano from territories taken from the Parish of Notre-Dame-du-Lac, the Parish of Saint-Louis-du-Ha! Ha! and other unorganized territories.
 27 August: Creation of the Village of Baie-de-Shawenegan from territories taken from the Parish of Sainte-Flore and the Township of Shawenegan.
 16 September: Creation of the Township of Natashquan.
 10 October: Creation of the Municipality of Nouvelle-et-Shoolbred from territories taken from the Municipality of Shoolbred.
 5 November: Creation of the Village of Coteau-du-Lac from territories taken from the Parish of Saint-Ignace-du-Coteau-du-Lac.
 12 December: Creation of the Village of Est-de-Saint-Georges-de-Beauce from territories taken from the Parish of Saint-Georges.

1908 
 1 January: The Village of Pontgravé is annexed by the Municipality of Chénier.
 2 April: The Municipality of Saint-Léon-le-Grand became a Parish. 
 14 April: 
The Town of Acton changed its name to Acton Vale.
The Village of Saint-Malo is annexed by Quebec City.
 25 April: 
The Town of Notre-Dame-des-Neiges is annexed by the City of Montréal.
The Town of Westmount became a City.
The Municipality of Limoilou became a Town.
Creation of the Municipality of Saint-Octave-de-Métis-Sud from territories taken from the Parish of Saint-Octave-de-Métis.
The Village of Boulevard-Saint-Paul became the Town of Ville-Émard.
The Village of Lac-Noir became the Town of Black Lake.
The Village of Saint-Pierre-aux-Liens became the Town of Ville-Saint-Pierre.
The Parish of Quebec became the Town of Montcalm.
 20 May: Creation of the Village of Saint-Alexis-de-la-Grande-Baie from territories taken from the Municipality of Grande-Baie.
 26 August: Creation of the Parish of Sainte-Sabine from territories taken from the United Townships of Roux-Bellechasse-et-Daaquam.
 31 August: Creation of the Parish of Saint-Bernard from territories taken from the Municipality of Saint-Ours and the Parish of Saint-Denis.
 11 September: Creation of the Parish of Sainte-Cécile from territories taken from the Parish of Saint-Pierre-les-Becquets.
 19 September: Creation of the Municipality of Péribonka from territories taken from the Municipality of Saint-Amédée.
 8 October: Creation of the Village of Annonciation from territories taken from the Township of Marchand.
 17 October: The Parish of Saint-Désiré-du-Lac-Noir became the Municipality of Saint-Joseph-de-Coleraine.
 27 October: Creation of the Village of Sacré-Cœur-de-Jésus from territories taken from the Parish of Sacré-Cœur-de-Jésus.
 20 November: Creation of the Parish of Saint-Joseph-de-Blandford from territories taken from the Parish of Sainte-Sophie-de-Lévrard.
 2 December: Creation of the Municipality of Templeton-Nord from territories taken from the Municipality of Templeton-Est and the Municipality of Templeton-Ouest.

1909 
 4 January: Creation of the Parish of Notre-Dame-du-Sacré-Cœur-d’Issoudun from territories taken from the Parish of Saint-Antoine-de-Tilly, the Parish of Saint-Apollinaire, the Parish of Saint-Édouard-de-Lotbinière, the Parish of Saint-Flavien and the Parish of Sainte-Croix.
 23 January: Creation of the Village of Bécancourt from territories taken from the Parish of Bécancour.
 27 January: Creation of the Village of Shawbridge from territories taken from the Municipality of Saint-Jérôme, the Parish of Saint-Sauveur and the Township of Abercrombie.
 1 February: Creation of the Township of Lytton.
 4 February: Creation of the Village of Ayer's Cliff from territories taken from the Township of Hatley.
 11 February: Creation of the Parish of Sainte-Hélène-de-Breakeyville from territories taken from the Parish of Saint-Jean-Chrysostome.
 1 March: The United Townships of Woburn-et-Louise became the Parish of Saint-Augustin-de-Woburn.
 9 March: Creation of the Village of Saint-Hugues from territories taken from the Parish of Saint-Hugues.
 10 March: Creation of the Municipality of Sainte-Edwidge from territories taken from the Municipality of Roberval.
 3 April: Creation of the Municipality of Metgermette-Nord from territories taken from the Township of Metgermette-Nord.
 27 April: Creation of the Village of Sainte-Thècle from territories taken from the Parish of Sainte-Thècle.
 7 May: 
The Town of Lachine became a City.
The Village of Laprairie-de-la-Magdeleine became the Town of La Prairie.
Creation of the Parish of Saint-Gérard-Magella from territories taken from the Parish of Ancienne-Lorette and the Parish of Saint-Ambroise.
 29 May: The Village of Lorimier is annexed by the City of Montréal.
 26 July: Creation of the Village of Laval from territories taken from the Parish of Sainte-Angèle-de-Laval.
 27 July: Creation of the Village of Robertsonville from territories taken from the Municipality of Nord-du-Canton-de-Thetford.
 30 August: The Municipality of Sainte-Edwidge became the Parish of Sainte-Hedwige.
 9 September: Creation of the Village of La Tuque.
 30 September: Creation of the Parish of Saint-Jacques-le-Majeur-de-Wolfestown from territories taken from the Township of Leeds and the Township of Wolfestown.
 14 October: Creation of the Village of Mont-Laurier from territories taken from the Township of Campbell.
 22 October: Creation of the Parish of Notre-Dame-des-Laurentides from territories taken from the Parish of Charlesbourg.
 14 December: Creation of the Parish of Sainte-Apolline-de-Patton from territories taken from the Municipality of Cap-Saint-Ignace.
 30 December: The Town of Limoilou is annexed by Quebec City.
 31 December: The Town of Saint-Louis is annexed by the City of Montréal.

1910 
 1 January: The Municipality of Nord-du-Canton-de-Thetford is split into the Parish of Saint-Antoine-de-Pontbriand and a section of the Parish of Sacré-Cœur-de-Marie.
Creation of the Parish of Sacré-Cœur-de-Marie from territories taken from the Municipality of Sud-du-Canton-de-Thetford and the former Municipality of Nord-du-Canton-de-Thetford.
 2 February: Creation of the Village of Tuque Falls.
 15 March: Creation of the Village of Saint-Bruno from territories taken from the Municipality of Saint-Bruno.
 11 April: Creation of the Village of Sault-au-Récollet from territories taken from the Parish of La Visitation-du-Sault-au-Récollet.
 4 June: 
The Town of Bordeaux, the Town of Côte-des-Neiges, the Town of Longue-Pointe, the Town of Notre-Dame-de-Grâce, the Town of Saint-Paul, the Town of Ville-Émard, the Village of Ahuntsic, the Village of Beaurivage-de-la-Longue-Pointe, the Village of Rosemont and the Village of Tétreaultville-de-Montréal are annexed by the City of Montréal.
The Town of Fraserville became a City.
Creation of the Town of Montréal-Est from territories taken from the Parish of Pointe-aux-Trembles.
Creation of the Town of Saint-Tite from territories taken from the Parish of Saint-Tite.
Creation of the Municipality of Saint-Isidore-d'Auckland from territories taken from the Township of Auckland.
Creation of the Parish of Brébeuf from territories taken from the Township of Amherst and the United Townships of DeSalaberry-et-Grandison.
 30 June: Creation of the Town of Beaconsfield from territories taken from the Municipality of Pointe-Claire.
 4 August: Creation of the Parish of Saint-Gabriel-Archange.
 3 November: The Village of Lauzon became a Town.

1911 
 4 January: Creation of the Village of Saint-Siméon from territories taken from the Parish of Saint-Siméon.
 5 January: Creation of the Parish of Saint-Eusèbe.
 31 January: Creation of the Parish of Saint-Antoine-de-Padoue-de-Kempt from territories taken from the Village of Saint-Moïse, the Parish of Saint-Octave-de-Métis and the Parish of Sainte-Angèle-de-Mérici.
 14 March: 
The Village of Montréal-Sud became a Town.
The Village of Saint-Joachim-de-la-Pointe-Claire became the Town of Pointe-Claire.
 24 March: 
Creation of the Town of Greenfield-Park from territories taken from the Parish of Longueuil.
Creation of the Town of La Tuque by the merger of the Village of La Tuque and the Village of Tuque Falls.
The Municipality of Est-du-Canton-Armagh changed its name to Sainte-Euphémie-sur-Rivière-du-Sud.
The Village of Rigaud became a Town.
Creation of the Township of Boyer.
 12 April: Creation of the Municipality of Sainte-Florence-de-Beaurivage.
 30 June: Creation of the Town of Baie-d’Urfée from territories taken from the Town of Sainte-Anne-de-Bellevue.
 10 August: Creation of the Village of Saint-Agapitville from territories taken from the Parish of Saint-Agapit-de-Beaurivage.
 26 August: Creation of the United Townships of Casgrain-et-Leverrier from territories taken from the Municipality of Saint-Pamphile.
 19 September: Creation of the Village of Sainte-Jeanne-de-Neuville from territories taken from the Parish of Sainte-Jeanne-de-Neuville.
 12 October: 
The Municipality of Shenley-Dorset-Jersey-et-Marlow became the Parish of Saint-Martin.
The Township of Marlow became the Parish of Saint-Gédéon.
 29 November: Creation of the Village of Saint-André-Avellin from territories taken from the Parish of Saint-André-Avellin.
 12 December: Creation of the Village of Bonsecours from territories taken from the Municipality of Islet.
 23 December: Creation of the Parish of Sainte-Croix from territories taken from the Municipality of Hébertville and the Parish of Saint-Jérôme.

1912 
 1 January: 
Creation of the Parish of Notre-Dame-des-Sept-Douleurs from territories taken from the Municipality of Isle-Verte and the Municipality of Kakonna.
Creation of the Township of Est-du-Canton-de-Campbell from territories taken from the Township of Campbell.
 24 January: Creation of the Village of Hatley from territories taken from the Township of Hatley.
 7 February: Creation of the Village of Bel-Air from territories taken from the Municipality of Saint-Eustache.
 14 March:
Creation of the Town of East Angus from territories taken from the Township of Westbury.
The Town of Thetford Mines became a City.
The Parish of Saint-Dunstan-du-Lac-de-Beauport changed its name to Saint-Dunstan-du-Lac-Beauport.
The Parish of Saints-Anges-de-Lachine became the Town of Ville-Lasalle.
 18 March:
Creation of the Village of Almaville from territories taken from the Parish of Notre-Dame-du-Mont-Carmel.
The Village of Saint-Dominique-de-Jonquière became the Town of Jonquière.
 30 March: Creation of the Parish of Saint-Léandre from territories taken from the Parish of Saint-Ulric.
 3 April: 
Creation of the Town of Laval-des-Rapides from territories taken from the Parish of Saint-Martin.
Creation of the Village of Courville from territories taken from the Municipality of Beauport.
The Village of Saint-Jean-Baptiste-de-la-Pointe-aux-Trembles became the Town of Pointe-aux-Trembles.
 12 June: Creation of the Parish of Saint-Nicolas-Sud from territories taken from the Parish of Saint-Nicolas.
 27 June: Creation of the Municipality of Partie-Est-du-Canton-d’Ely from territories taken from the Township of Ely and the Township of Ely-Nord.
 10 July: Creation of the Village of Saint-Hilaire from territories taken from the Parish of Saint-Hilaire.
 23 July: Creation of the Village of Saint-Charles-des-Grondines from territories taken from the Municipality of Grondines.
 27 July: Creation of the Village of Lyster from territories taken from the Municipality of Sainte-Anastasie-de-Nelson.
 12 August: Creation of the Village of Kénogami from territories taken from the Parish of Saint-Dominique-de-Jonquières.
 20 September: Creation of the Village of Linière from territories taken from the Parish of Saint-Côme-de-Kennebec.
 1 October: Creation of the Parish of Saint-Viateur from territories taken from the Parish of Saint-Cuthbert.
 10 October: Creation of the Village of Saint-Flavien from territories taken from the Parish of Saint-Flavien.
 22 October: Creation of the Village of Saint-Casimir from territories taken from the Parish of Saint-Casimir.
 24 October:
The Municipality of Nouvelle-et-Shoolbred changed its name to Escuminac. 
The Municipality of Shoolbred changed its name to Saint-Jean-l’Evangéliste.
 2 November: Creation of the Village of Rivière-du-Moulin from territories taken from the Municipality of Chicoutimi.
 6 November: Creation of the Village of Saint-Michel-de-Laval from territories taken from the Parish of La Visitation-du-Sault-au-Récollet and the Parish of Saint-Léonard-de-Port-Maurice.
 7 November: Creation of the Village of Saint-Léonard-d’Aston from territories taken from the Municipality of Saint-Léonard.
 12 November: Creation of the Municipality of Sud-Ouest-du-Canton-d’Halifax-Sud from territories taken from the Township of Halifax-Sud.
 15 November: Creation of the Municipality of Nord-du-Canton-de-Windsor from territories taken from the Township of Windsor.
 10 December: Creation of the Village of Saint-Jacques-de-l'Achigan from territories taken from the Parish of Saint-Jacques.
 13 December: Creation of the Village of Pérade from territories taken from the Parish of Sainte-Anne-de-la-Pérade.
 21 December: 
The Town of Maisonneuve became a City.
Creation of the Town of Mont-Royal from territories taken from the Parish of Saint-Laurent.
The Town of Summerlea is annexed by the City of Lachine.
The Town of Verdun became a City.
The Village of Cartier-Ville became the Town of Cartierville.
Creation of the Village of Giffard from territories taken from the Municipality of Beauport.

1913 
 1 January: 
The Town of Montcalm is annexed by Quebec City.
The Village of Bel-Air is annexed by the Municipality of Saint-Eustache.
The Parish of Saint-Gabriel-Archange changed its name to La Durantaye.
 29 January: Creation of the Village of Lambton from territories taken from the Municipality of Lambton.
 11 February: Creation of the Village of Rapide-de-l’Orignal from territories taken from the United Townships of Robertson-et-Pope.
 19 February: Creation of the Village of Beauport from territories taken from the Municipality of Beauport.
 27 March: Creation of the Village of Sainte-Cécile from territories taken from the Parish of Sainte-Cécile.
 23 April: 
The Village of Saint-Ambroise changed its name to Loretteville.
Creation of the Village of Saint-Zotique from territories taken from the Parish of Saint-Zotique.
Creation of the Parish of Notre-Dame-de-Mont-Carmel from territories taken from the Parish of Saint-Bernard-de-Lacolle.
 30 May: Creation of the Village of Sainte-Marie from territories taken from the Parish of Sainte-Marie-de-la-Nouvelle-Beauce.
 31 May: Creation of the Municipality of Nouveau-Salaberry from territories taken from the Parish of Sainte-Cécile.
 1 June: Creation of the Town of Châteauguay from territories taken from the Parish of Saint-Joachim-de-Châteauguay.
 27 June: The United Townships of Bowman-et-Villeneuve are split into the Township of Bowman and the Township of Villeneuve.
 8 July: Creation of the Village of Saint-Henri from territories taken from the Parish of Saint-Henri.
 24 July: Creation of the Municipality of Partie-Sud-du-Canton-de-Masham from territories taken from the Township of Masham.
 7 August: The Village of Baie-Saint-Paul became a Town.
 29 September: Creation of the Village of Saint-Casimir-Est from territories taken from the Parish of Saint-Casimir.
 16 December: Creation of the Township of Saint-Godefroi from territories taken from the Township of Hope.
 22 December: Creation of the Village of Verchères from territories taken from the Municipality of Verchères.
 29 December: The Parish of Saint-Antoine-de-Padoue-de-Kempt changed its name to Saint-Antoine-de-Padoue.
 31 December: Creation of the Village of Fortierville from territories taken from the Parish of Sainte-Philomène-de-Fortierville.

1914 
 19 January: Creation of the Village of Saint-Dominique from territories taken from the Parish of Saint-Dominique.
 31 January: Creation of the Village of Amos.
 19 February: 
Creation of the Town of Hampstead from territories taken from the Village of Côte-Saint-Luc.
Creation of the Town of Roxboro from territories taken from the Parish of Sainte-Geneviève.
The Town of Windsor Mills changed its name to Windsor.
Creation of the Municipality of Lac-des-Seize-Îles from territories taken from the Township of Montcalm and the Township of Wentworth.
The Village of Beloeil became a Town.
Creation of the Village of Saraguay from territories taken from the Town of Cartierville and the Parish of Saint-Laurent.
The Village of Sault-au-Récollet became a Town.
 11 March: Creation of the Village of Notre-Dame-de-Portneuf from territories taken from the Parish of Notre-Dame-de-Portneuf.
 29 March: Creation of the Parish of Saint-Honoré from territories taken from the Township of Tremblay.
 3 April: Creation of the United Townships of Masson-et-Laviolette.
 4 April: Creation of the Village of Sainte-Agathe from territories taken from the Parish of Sainte-Agathe.
 14 May: Creation of the Parish of Saint-Joseph-de-la-Rivière-Bleue.
 1 June: Creation of the Town of Léry from territories taken from the Parish of Saint-Joachim-de-Châteauguay.
 17 June: Creation of the Municipality of Sainte-Rose from territories taken from the Parish of Sainte-Rose-de-Lima.
 25 June: Creation of the Village of Amiante from territories taken from the Municipality of Sud-du-Canton-de-Thetford.
 28 July: Creation of the Village of Val-Barrette from territories taken from the Township of Est-du-Canton-de-Campbell.
 27 August: 
Creation of the Village of Farnham from territories taken from the Township of Farnham-Est.
Creation of the Village of Rougemont from territories taken from the Parish of Saint-Michel-de-Rougemont.
 29 October: 
Creation of the Municipality of Sept-Cantons-Unis-de-Saguenay.
Creation of the Parish of Saint-Siméon from territories taken from the Parish of Saint-Bonaventure-de-Hamilton.
 5 November: Creation of the Village of Lotbinière from territories taken from the Municipality of Lotbinière.
 7 November: Creation of the Village of Charlesbourg from territories taken from the Municipality of Charlesbourg.
 28 December: Creation of the Township of Romieux from territories taken from the United Townships of Dalibaire-et-Romieu.

1915 
 30 January: Creation of the Village of Saint-Charles from territories taken from the Parish of Saint-Charles-Boromée.
 5 March: 
Creation of the Town of Île-Dorval from territories taken from the Town of Dorval.
Creation of the Town of Laval-sur-le-Lac from territories taken from the Parish of Sainte-Dorothée and the Parish of Sainte-Rose-de-Lima.
The Town of Outremont became a City.
Creation of the Municipality of Honfleur from territories taken from the Parish of Saint-Anselme, the Parish of Saint-Gervais-et-Saint-Protais, the Parish of Saint-Lazare and the Parish of Sainte-Claire.
Creation of the Municipality of Lac-Tremblant-Nord from territories taken from the Township of Joly.
The Village of Saint-Michel-de-Laval became the Town of Ville-Saint-Michel.
The Village of Sainte-Agathe-des-Monts became a Town.
The Parish of La Visitation-du-Sault-au-Récollet became the Town of Montréal-Nord.
Creation of the Parish of Notre-Dame-de-Liesse from territories taken from the Parish of Saint-Laurent.
The Parish of Saint-Léonard-de-Port-Maurice became a Town.
 17 April: The Parish of Saint-Félicien-Partie-Nord-Ouest changed its name to Notre-Dame-de-la-Doré.
 21 April: Creation of the Village of Donnacona from territories taken from the Parish of Saint-Jean-Baptiste-des-Écureuils.
 3 May: Creation of the Municipality of Sainte-Madeleine-de-la-Rivière-Madeleine from territories taken from the Municipality of Saint-Maxime-du-Mont-Louis.
 10 May: Creation of the Village of Saint-Pierre-du-Lac from territories taken from the Parish of Saint-Pierre-du-Lac.
 25 May: The Village of Rapide-de-l’Orignal is annexed by the Village of Mont-Laurier.
 14 September: Creation of the Village of Saint-Alexandre from territories taken from the Parish of Saint-Alexandre.
 22 September: Creation of the Municipality of Escourt.
 28 September: Creation of the Parish of Saint-Raymond-de-Pennafort-de-Weedon from territories taken from the Township of Weedon.
 5 October: Creation of the Village of Turcotte from territories taken from the Parish of Saint-Théophile.
 7 October: Creation of the Village of Val-Jalbert from territories taken from the Municipality of Roberval and the Parish of Saint-Louis-de-Métabetchouan.
 27 October: 
Creation of the Village of Angers from territories taken from the Village of Masson.
Creation of the Village of Deux-Rivières from territories taken from the Parish of Saint-Stanislas-de-la-Rivière-des-Envies.
 29 October: Creation of the Village of Howick from territories taken from the Parish of Très-Saint-Sacrement.
 26 November: Creation of the Village of L’Abord-à-Plouffe from territories taken from the Parish of Saint-Martin.

1916 
 1 January: 
Creation of the Parish of Sainte-Marthe-du-Cap-de-la-Magdeleine from territories taken from the Parish of Cap-de-la-Magdeleine.
The United Townships of Normandin-et-d’Albanel became the Township of Normandin.
 7 January: The Municipality of North-Stukely became the Parish of Sainte-Anne-de-Stukely.
 13 January: Creation of the Village of Chandler from territories taken from the Municipality of Pabos.
 19 January: The Parish of Saint-Louis-de-Métabetchouan changed its name to Saint-Louis-de-Chambord.
 7 February: Creation of the Municipality of Talon from territories taken from the United Townships of Rolette-Panet-et-Talon.
 9 March: 
Creation of the Town of Québec-Ouest from territories taken from the Municipality of Petite-Rivière.
Creation of the Town of Trois-Pistoles from territories taken from the Municipality of Trois-Pistoles.
The Parish of Pointe-aux-Trembles became the Town of Laval-de-Montréal.
 16 March: 
The Town of Lévis became a City.
The Village of Dorion became a Town.
Creation of the Parish of Saint-Léonard-de-Port-Maurice from territories taken from the Town of Saint-Léonard-de-Port-Maurice.
 31 March: 
Creation of the Municipality of Saint-Henri-de-Taillon from territories taken from the Municipality of Saint-Henri-de-Taillon.
Creation of the Village of Warden from territories taken from the Township of Shefford.
 8 May: Creation of the Village of Saint-Gédéon from territories taken from the Parish of Saint-Gédéon.
 3 August: Creation of the Village of Cap-à-l'Aigle from territories taken from the Parish of Saint-Étienne-de-Murray-Bay.
 12 August: The Village of Saint-Pierre-du-Lac changed its name to Val-Brillant.
 26 September: The Township of Northfield became a Municipality.
 4 October: Creation of the Parish of Sainte-Claire-d’Assise from territories taken from the Parish of Saint-Zotique.
 12 October: Creation of the Parish of Saint-Raphaël from territories taken from the Municipality Saint-Wenceslas, the Municipality of Sainte-Eulalie and the Parish of Sainte-Anne-du-Sault.
 22 December: 
The Town of Cartierville and the Town of Sault-au-Récollet are annexed by the City of Montréal.
The Town of Saint-Jean became a City.
The Village of Courville became a Town.
The Village of Granby became a City.
The Village of Sainte-Thérèse-de-Blainville became the Town of Sainte-Thérèse.

1917 
 1 January: 
Creation of the Municipality of Nord-Est-des-Cantons-de-Wabassee-Dudley-et-Bouthiller from territories taken from the United Townships of Wabassee, Dudley et Bouthillier.
Creation of the Parish of Saint-Louis-de-Gonzague-du-Cap-Tourmente from territories taken from the Parish of Saint-Joachim.
 1 February: The Parish of Notre-Dame-de-la-Victoire is annexed by the City of Lévis.
 8 February: Creation of the Village of Ferme-Neuve from territories taken from the United Townships of Wurtele-Moreau-et-Gravel.
 27 February: Creation of the Municipality of Saint-Charles-de-Charlesbourg from territories taken from the Parish of Charlesbourg.
 5 March: Creation of the Village of Wakefield from territories taken from the Township of Masham and the Township of Wakefield.
 28 March: Creation of the Municipality of Saindon from territories taken from the Parish of Sainte-Marie-de-Sayabec.
 30 March: The Village of Saint-Jacques-de-l'Achigan changed its name to Saint-Jacques.
 2 April: Creation of the Village of Petit-Lac-Magog from territories taken from the Township of Orford.
 11 May: Creation of the Village of Sainte-Angèle-de-Mérici from territories taken from the Parish of Sainte-Angèle-de-Mérici.
 7 June: Creation of the Village of Foster from territories taken from the Township of Brome.
 11 June: Creation of the Parish of Saint-Venant-de-Hereford from territories taken from the Township of Hereford.
 18 June: Creation of the Village of Saint-Jovite from territories taken from the United Townships of DeSalaberry-et-Grandison.
 31 July: Creation of the Village of McMasterville from territories taken from the Parish of Saint-Mathieu-de-Beloeil.
 1 August: Creation of the Municipality of Parties-des-Paroisses-de-Saint-Constant-et-Saint-Philippe from territories taken from the Parish of Saint-Constant and the Parish of Saint-Philippe.
 15 August: Creation of the Township of La Sarre.
 28 August: Creation of the Parish of Sainte-Angèle from territories taken from the Parish of Saint-Paulin and the Parish of Sainte-Ursule.
 10 September: Creation of the United Townships of Figuery-et-Dalquier.
 29 September: Creation of the United Townships of La Reine-et-Desmeloizes.
 2 October: 
Creation of the Municipality of Bishop's Crossing from territories taken from the Municipality of Dudswell.
Creation of the Municipality of Hatley from territories taken from the Township of Hatley.
 10 October: Creation of the Village of Champlain from territories taken from the Parish of Champlain.
 22 October: Creation of the Municipality of Saint-Joseph-d’Alma from territories taken from the Municipality of Saint-Joseph-d’Alma.
 14 December: Creation of the Village of Saint-Ambroise from territories taken from the Municipality of Saint-Ambroise.

1918 
 4 January: Creation of the Village of Delson from territories taken from the Parish of Saint-Constant.
 17 January: Creation of the Village of Saint-Alban from territories taken from the Parish of Saint-Alban-d'Alton.
 8 February: 
Creation of the Village of Calumet from territories taken from the Township of Grenville.
Creation of the Village of Como-Est from territories taken from the Village of Como.
 9 February: 
The City of Maisonneuve is annexed by the City of Montréal.
The Town of Joliette became a City.
Creation of the Municipality of Charette.
The Village of Sainte-Rose became a Town.
The Parish of Cap-de-la-Magdeleine became the Town of Cap-de-la-Madeleine.
Creation of the Parish of Saint-Edmond-de-Grantham from territories taken from the Parish of Saint-Bonaventure, the Parish of Saint-Germain and the Parish of Saint-Guillaume.
 15 February: Creation of the United Townships of Royal-Roussillon-et-Poularies.
 18 February: Creation of the United Townships of Fiedmont-et-Barraute.
 22 February: Creation of the Parish of Saint-Cyprien from territories taken from the Municipality of Sainte-Rose-de-Watford and the Parish of Sainte-Justine.
 23 February: The Village of Sainte-Jeanne-de-Neuville changed its name to Pont-Rouge.
 6 March: Creation of the Village of Saint-Herménégilde from territories taken from the Municipality of Saint-Herménégilde.
 7 March: Creation of the Parish of Notre-Dame-de-Bonsecours from territories taken from the Parish of Notre-Dame-de-Bonsecours.
 12 March: Creation of the Village of Saint-Boniface-de-Shawinigan from territories taken from the Township of Shawenegan.
 22 April: Creation of the Municipality of Port-Alfred from territories taken from the Municipality of Grande-Baie and the Village of Saint-Alexis-de-la-Grande-Baie.
 27 May: Creation of the Municipality of Saint-Fabien-de-Panet from territories taken from the Parish of Saint-Fabien-de-Panet.
 28 May: Creation of the Municipality of L’Annonciation from territories taken from the Parish of Annonciation.
 1 June: Creation of the Town of Maple Grove from territories taken from the Parish of Saint-Clément.
 27 June: Creation of the Village of Luceville from territories taken from the Parish of Sainte-Luce.
 15 July: Creation of the Township of Landrienne and the Township of Trécesson.
 29 July: Creation of the Parish of Saint-Joseph-de-Mont-Rolland from territories taken from the Parish of Sainte-Adèle.
 15 August: Creation of the Municipality of Figuery-et-Dalquier.
 20 September: Creation of the Municipality of Authier and the Municipality of La Reine-et-Desmeloizes.
 3 October: The Municipality of Saint-Henri-de-Taillon changed its name to Jeanne-d’Arc.
 24 October: 
Creation of the Village of Saint-Marc-des-Carrières from territoires taken from the Municipality of Deschambault, the Municipality of Grondines and the Parish of Saint-Alban-d'Alton.
Creation of the United Townships of Carpentier-et-de-Courville.
 7 November: 
Creation of the Village of Durham-Sud from territories taken from the Municipality of Durham-Sud.
Creation of the Parish of Saint-François-Xavier-des-Hauteurs.
 14 November: Creation of the Municipality of Tourville from territories taken the Township of Ashford.
 21 November: Creation of the Village of Tring-Jonction from territories taken from the Parish of Saint-Frédéric-de-Beauce.

1919 
 12 February: Creation of the Village of Wottonville from territories taken from the Township of Wotton.
 25 February: Creation of the Parish of Ascension-de-Notre-Seigneur from territories taken from the Township of Delisle and other unorganized territories.
 4 March: 
The City of Fraserville changed its name to Rivière-du-Loup.
Creation of the Township of Bedford from territories taken from the Town of Bedford.
 19 April: Creation of the Township of Privat.
 29 April: Creation of the Village of Macamic from territories taken from the United Townships of Royal-Roussillon-et-Poularies.
 9 June: Creation of the Village of Saint-Rédempteur from territories taken from the Parish of Saint-Étienne-de-Lauzon.
 13 June: 
Creation of the Village of Francoeur from territories taken from the Parish of Saint-Apollinaire.
Creation of the Township of Senneterre.
 7 July: Creation of the Municipality of Est-de-la-Paroisse-de-Sainte-Flore from territories taken from the Parish of Sainte-Flore.
 30 July
Creation of the Village of Montauban from territories taken from the Parish of Notre-Dame-des-Anges-de-Montauban, the Parish of Saint-Rémi and the Parish of Saint-Ubalde.
Creation of the Village of Notre-Dame-des-Anges from territories taken from the Parish of Notre-Dame-des-Anges-de-Montauban.
 2 August: The Village of Turcotte changed its name to Saint-Georges.
 12 August: 
Creation of the Village of Saint-Liboire from territories taken from the Parish of Saint-Liboire.
Creation of the Township of Dumas from territories taken from the Township of Saint-Jean.
 5 September: The Municipality of Port-Alfred became a Town.
 29 September: Creation of the Village of Saint-Timothée from territories taken from the Parish of Saint-Thimothée.
 14 October: Creation of the Village of Lac-Saint-Louis from territories taken from the Parish of Saint-Clément.
 15 October: Creation of the Village of Saint-Sylvestre from territories taken from the Parish of Saint-Sylvestre-de-Beaurivage.
 5 November: The Municipality of Escourt changes its name to Saint-David-d’Escourt.
 20 November: Creation of the Village of Neuville from territories taken from the Municipality of Pointe-aux-Trembles.
 3 December: The Municipality of Saint-Fabien-de-Panet changed its name to Saint-Juste-de-Bretenières.
 16 December: Creation of the Village of Rawdon from territories taken from the Township of Rawdon.
 30 December: Creation of the Village of Sainte-Madeleine from territories taken from the Parish of Sainte-Marie-Madeleine.

1920 
 7 January: 
The Village of Bagotville became a Town.
Creation of the Parish of Sainte-Anne-de-Beaupré from territories taken from the Village of Sainte-Anne-de-Beaupré.
 14 February: 
The Town of Grand-Mère became a City.
The Town of Longueuil became a City.
Creation of the Town of Saguenay from territories taken from the Municipality of Chicoutimi.
The Town of Saint-Germain-de-Rimouski changed its name to Rimouski.
The Village of Kénogami became a Town.
The Village of Lennoxville became a Town.
Creation of the Township of Décarie.
 2 March: 
Creation of the Village of Templeton and the Municipality of Templeton-Est from territories taken from the Municipality of Templeton-Est.
Creation of the Township of Ely-Partie-Ouest from territories taken from the Township of Ely and the Township of Ely-Nord.
 8 March: The Municipality of Whitton changed its name to Sainte-Cécile-de-Whitton.
 3 April: Creation of the Village of Saint-Jean-de-Boischatel from territories taken from the Parish of Ange-Gardien.
 28 April: Creation of the Parish of Saint-Zénon-du-Lac-Humqui.
 29 April: Creation of the Municipality of Loranger from territories taken from the Township of Loranger.
 7 May: Creation of the Municipality of Brompton-Gore from territories taken from the Township of Melbourne.
 25 May: Creation of the Village of Belle-Plage from territories taken from the Municipality of Vaudreuil.
 1 June: Creation of the Village of Bic from territories taken from the Parish of Sainte-Cécile-du-Bic.
 17 June: Creation of the Village of Saint-Ubalde from territories taken from the Parish of Saint-Ubalde.
 8 July:
Creation of the Municipality of Suffolk from territories taken from the United Townships of Suffolk-et-Addington.
Creation of the Village of Beauport-Est from territories taken from the Municipality of Beauport and the Village of Beauport.
 28 August: Creation of the Village of Saint-Anselme from territories taken from the Parish of Saint-Anselme.
 11 October: Creation of the Municipality of Montpellier from territories taken from the Township of Ripon, the United Townships of Hartwell-et-Preston, the United Townships of Mulgrave-et-Derry and other unorganized territories.
 15 October: Creation of the Village of Clarenceville from territories taken from the Parish of Saint-Georges-de-Clarenceville.
 26 October: Creation of the Parish of Saint-Raphaël-d’Albertville.
 16 November: 
Creation of the Village of Saint-Alexis from territories taken from the Parish of Saint-Alexis.
Creation of the Village of Saint-Joseph-de-la-Rivière-Bleue from territories taken from the Parish of Saint-Joseph-de-la-Rivière-Bleue.
 17 November: The Township of Egan is split into the Municipality of Bois-Franc, the Municipality of Egan-Sud and the Municipality of Montcerf.
 20 November: The Village of Donnacona became a Town.
 11 December: Creation of the Village of Lacolle from territories taken from the Parish of Notre-Dame-de-Mont-Carmel.

1921 
 31 January: Creation of the Municipality of Bouchette-Sud from territories taken from the Township of Bouchette and the Township of Wright.
 1 February: Creation of the Village of Saint-Cœur-de-Marie from territories taken from the Township of Delisle.
 25 February: Creation of the Town of Lac-Sergent from territories taken from the Parish of Saint-Raymond-Nonnat and the Parish of Sainte-Catherine.
 17 March: The Village of Huntingdon became a Town.
 18 March: Creation of the Village of Épiphanie from territories taken from the Parish of L’Épiphanie.
 19 March: 
The Town of Saint-Lambert became a City.
The Town of Shawinigan-Falls became a City.
The Municipality of Parties-des-Paroisses-de-Saint-Constant-et-Saint-Philippe became the Parish of Saint-Mathieu.
The Village of Petit-Métis changed its name to Métis-sur-Mer.
Creation of the Parish of Saint-Camille-de-Lellis from territories taken from the United Townships of Roux-Bellechasse-et-Daaquam.
 21 March: 
Creation of the Municipality of Rock Forest from territories taken from the Township of Ascot and the Township of Orford.
Creation of the Parish of Saint-Pierre-d’Estcourt from territories taken from the Municipality of Saint-David-d’Escourt and the Township of Pohénégamook.
 20 April: Creation of the Township of Langelier.
 29 April: Creation of the Village of Saint-Isidore from territories taken from the Parish of Saint-Isidore-de-Lauzon.
 10 May: Creation of the Village of Saint-Jean-Baptiste-de-Bélisle from territories taken from the Parish of Sainte-Agathe.
 14 May: The Village of Como changed its name to Hudson.
 18 May: Creation of the Township of Launay.
 19 May: Creation of the Parish of Saint-Cléophas.
 30 May: 
Creation of the Municipality of Ouest-du-Canton-de-la-Motte.
Creation of the Village of Sainte-Croix from territories taken from the Parish of Sainte-Croix.
 4 June: 
Creation of the Municipality of Saint-Roch-Ouest from territories taken from the Parish of Saint-Roch.
Creation of the Village of Saint-Raphaël from territories taken from the Parish of Saint-Raphaël.
Creation of the Village of Saint-Ulric from territories taken from the Parish of Saint-Ulric.
 13 June: Creation of the Parish of Saint-Amable from territories taken from the Parish of Saint-Marc and the Parish of Saint-Mathieu-de-Beloeil.
 12 July: Creation of the Village of Saint-Clet from territories taken from the Parish of Saint-Clet.
 20 July: Creation of the Municipality of Rivière-du-Gouffre from territories taken from the Parish of Baie-Saint-Paul.
 21 July: Creation of the Village of Deschênes from territories taken from the Municipality of Hull.
 22 July: Creation of the Municipality of Sydenham-Sud from territories taken from the Municipality of Baie-de-Gaspé-Nord.
 12 August: Creation of the Parish of Saint-Luc from territories taken from the Parish of Saint-Léon-de-Standon and the Parish of Sainte-Germaine-du-Lac-Etchemin.
 18 August: Creation of the Village of Saint-Eustache-sur-le-Lac from territories taken from the Municipality of Saint-Eustache.
 19 August:
Creation of the Municipality of Messine from territories taken from the Township of Bouchette.
Creation of the Village of Saint-Ludger from territories taken from the Municipality of Gayhurst.
 14 September: Creation of the Village of Saint-Patrice-de-Beaurivage from territories taken from the Parish of Saint-Patrice-de-Beaurivage.
 13 October: 
Creation of the Municipality of Girardville.
Creation of the Municipality of Saint-Antoine-sur-Richelieu from territories taken from the Parish of Saint-Antoine-de-Padoue.
 23 November: The Municipality of Loranger changed its name to Lacaille.
 21 December: Creation of the Village of Laterrière from territories taken from the Parish of Notre-Dame-de-Laterrière.
 13 December: Creation of the Parish of Sacré-Cœur-de-Jésus.

1922 
 25 January: Creation of the Municipality of Rivière-Boyer from territories taken from the Parish of Saint-Henri.
 26 January: Creation of the Village of Kingsey Falls from territories taken from the Municipality of Chutes-de-Kingsey.
 27 January: Creation of the Village of Manseau from territories taken from the Parish of Saint-Joseph-de-Blandford.
 30 January: Creation of the Parish of Sainte-Jeanne-d'Arc.
 8 February: Creation of the Township of Bégin.
 13 February: Creation of the Parish of Saint-Narcisse-de-Rimouski from territories taken from the Parish of Sainte-Blandine.
 1 March: Creation of the Village of Saint-Victor-de-Tring from territories taken from the Municipality of Saint-Victor-de-Tring.
 8 March: The Town of Baie-Saint-Paul became a Village.
 21 March:
Creation of the Town of Île-Cadieux from territories taken from the Municipality of Vaudreuil.
Creation of the Parish of Larouche.
 24 April: Creation of the Village of Saint-Paul from territories taken from the Parish of Conversion-de-Saint-Paul.
 30 May:
Creation of the Municipality of Paspébiac-Ouest from territories taken from the Municipality of Paspébiac.
Creation of the Village of La Reine from territories taken from the United Townships of La Reine-et-Desmeloizes.
 27 June: Creation of the Municipality of Val-Morin from territories taken from the Parish of Sainte-Adèle.
 31 July: Creation of the Village of Saint-Wenceslas from territories taken from the Municipality of Saint-Wenceslas.
 14 August: Creation of the Municipality of Lemieux from territories taken from territories taken from the Parish of Saint-Joseph-de-Blandford and the Parish of Sainte-Marie-de-Blandford.
 11 September: Creation of the Municipality of Lac-Saint-Paul from territories taken from the United Townships of Wurtele-Moreau-et-Gravel.
 16 September: The Municipality of Nord-du-Canton-de-Windsor changed its name to Saint-Claude.
 18 September: Creation of the Village of Sainte-Monique from territories taken from the Parish of Sainte-Monique.
 22 September: Creation of the Village of Saint-Faustin-Station from territories taken from the Township of Wolfe.
 20 October: Creation of the Village of Wickham-Ouest from territories taken from the Municipality of Wickham-Ouest.
 9 November: Creation of the Municipality of Rivière-Blanche from territories taken from the Township of Ireland-Nord.
 16 December: The Municipality of La Reine-et-Desmeloizes changed its name to Saint-Jacques-de-Dupuy.
 20 December: Creation of the Village of Sainte-Adèle from territories taken from the Parish of Sainte-Adèle.
 29 December: The Town of Cap-de-la-Madeleine became a City.

1923 
 17 March: Creation of the Municipality of Saint-Louis-de-Gonzague from territories taken from the Municipality of Sainte-Rose-de-Watford and the Parish of Saint-Cyprien.
 23 March: Creation of the Township of Senneterre.
 11 May: Creation of the Municipality of Saint-Thomas-Didyme.
 23 May: 
Creation of the Municipality of Saint-Dominique-du-Lac from territories taken from the Parish of Notre-Dame-du-Lac and other unorganized territories.
Creation of the Parish of Saint-Maurice from territories taken from the Township of Fox.
 7 June: The Township of Pohénégamook became the Parish of Saint-Éleuthère.
 20 June: 
Creation of the Village of Brome from territories taken from the Township of Brome.
Creation of the Village of Saint-Prime from territories taken from the Parish of Saint-Prime.
 26 June: Creation of the Village of Ripon from territories taken from the Township of Ripon.
 28 July: The Municipality of Suffolk changed its name to Vinoy.
 22 September: Creation of the Municipality of Piedmont from territories taken from the Parish of Saint-Sauveur.
 25 September: Creation of the Village of Shawinigan-Est from territories taken from the Parish of Sainte-Flore.
 30 October: Creation of the Township of Otis.
 14 November: 
Creation of the Municipality of Saint-Eugène from territories taken from the Municipality of Saint-Michel-de-Mistassini.
Creation of the Village of Cabano from territories taken from the Parish of Saint-Mathias-de-Cabano.
 18 December: Creation of the Municipality of Christie, the Municipality of Duchesnay and the Parish of Saint-Joachim-de-Tourelle from territories taken from the Municipality of Sainte-Anne-des-Monts.

1924 
 12 January: The Village of Beauport became a Town.
 14 January: Creation of the Parish of Saint-Joseph-de-Kamouraska from territories taken from the Parish of Saint-Alexandre, the Parish of Saint-André and the Parish of Sainte-Hélène.
 7 February: Creation of the Parish of Sainte-Jeanne-d’Arc from territories taken from the Municipality of Saint-Amédée, the Municipality of Saint-Michel-de-Mistassini and other unorganized territories.
 8 February: The Village of Bienville is annexed by the Town of Lauzon.
 27 February: Creation of the Township of Denholm.
 15 March Creation of the Town of Isle-Maligne from territories taken from the Municipality of Saint-Joseph-d’Alma.
 11 April: Creation of the Municipality of Dollard-des-Ormeaux from territories taken from the Parish of Sainte-Geneviève.
 30 April: Creation of the Village of Saint-Charles-sur-Richelieu from territories taken from the Parish of Saint-Charles.
 7 May: Creation of the Municipality of Poularies from territories taken from the United Townships of Royal-Roussillon-et-Poularies.
 26 July: The Village of Lac-Weedon changed its name to Saint-Gérard.
 3 September: Creation of the Parish of Saint-Gérard-des-Laurentides from territories taken from the Parish of Sainte-Flore.
 22 September: Creation of the Municipality of Villeroy.
 4 October: The Parish of Saint-Nazaire-de-Dorchester changed its name to Saint-Nazaire.
 17 November: Creation of the Village of Saint-Joseph-de-Grantham from territories taken from the Township of Grantham.
 18 November: Creation of the Municipality of Saint-Jean-Baptiste from territories taken from the Village of Mont-Joli.
 19 November:
Creation of the Municipality of Sainte-Lucie-de-Beauregard from territories taken from the Municipality of Talon.
Creation of the Parish of Saint-Marcellin.
 15 December:
Creation of the Municipality of Shigawake from territories taken from the Township of Saint-Godefroi.
The Parish of Notre-Dame-du-Perpétuel-Secours-de-Charny became the Village of Charny.
 16 December: The Municipality of Saint-Joseph-d’Alma became a Town.
 29 December: Creation of the Village of Enfant-Jésus from territories taken from the Parish of L'Enfant-Jésus.

1925 
 1 January: The Town of Laval-de-Montréal is annexed by the Town of Pointe-aux-Trembles.
 13 February: The Village of Shawinigan-Est is annexed by the City of Shawinigan Falls.
 4 March: Creation of the Town of Riverbend from territories taken from the Municipality of Saint-Joseph-d’Alma.
 3 April: The Village of Amos became a Town.
 14 May: Creation of the Parish of Saint-Augustin from territories taken from the Municipality of Péribonka and the Municipality of Saint-Amédée.
 19 May: Creation of the Village of McNaugton from territories taken from the Village of Hudson.
 2 July: Creation of the Village of Saint-Paulin from territories taken from the Parish of Saint-Paulin.
 9 September: Creation of the Village of Sainte-Hélène-de-Bagot from territories taken from the Parish of Sainte-Hélène.
 6 October: 
Creation of the Municipality of Labrecque from territories taken from the Township of Taché and other unorganized territories.
Creation of the Parish of Saint-Benoît-Abbé.
 28 October: Creation of the Parish of Notre-Dame-de-Lourdes from territories taken from the Municipality of Sainte-Elizabeth.
 14 December: Creation of the Municipality of Rivière-au-Tonnerre.

1926 
 3 March: 
Creation of the Municipality of Louis-Joliette from territories taken from the Parish of Sainte-Claire.
Creation of the Village of Priceville from territories taken from the Parish of Saint-Octave-de-Métis.
 6 March: The Village of Hudson changed its name to Hudson Heights.
 11 March: Creation of the Town of Noranda.
 20 March: The Parish of Sainte-Marguerite-de-Blairfindie became the Municipality of Lacadie.
 24 March: 
Creation of the City of Arvida from territories taken from the Municipality of Chicoutimi and the Parish of Saint-Dominique-de-Jonquières.
Creation of the Town of Barkmere from territories taken from the Township of Arundel and the Township of Montcalm.
Creation of the Town of Château-d’Eau from territories taken from the Village of Loretteville.
 6 April: 
Creation of the Municipality of Pont-Viau from territories taken from the Municipality of Saint-Vincent-de-Paul.
Creation of the Village of Cap-Chat from territories taken from the Municipality of Saint-Norbert-du-Cap-Chatte.
 10 April: The Village of McNaugton changed its name to Hudson.
 26 April: Creation of the Village of Normandin from territories taken from the Township of Normandin.
 5 May: Creation of the Village of Rouyn.
 8 May: Creation of the Municipality of Huberdeau from territories taken from the Township of Arundel.
 18 May: The Village of New-Rockland is annexed by the Village of Kingsbury.
 29 June: Creation of the Parish of Notre-Dame-de-la-Providence from territories taken from the Parish of Saint-François and the Parish of Saint-Georges.
 10 July: Creation of the Village of Saint-Félix-de-Valois from territories taken from the Municipality of Saint-Félix-de-Valois.
 29 July: Creation of the Village of Saint-Sauveur-des-Monts from territories taken from the Parish of Saint-Sauveur.
 16 August:
The Municipality of Saint-Amédée is annexed by the Municipality of Péribonka.
Creation of the Village of Saint-Emilien from territories taken from the Parish of Saint-Jérôme.
 27 August: 
Creation of the Municipality of Colombourg from territories taken from the Township of La Sarre.
Creation of the Parish of Saint-Jean-Baptiste-Vianney.
 3 September: Creation of the Parish of Saint-François-d’Assise from territories taken from the Township of Matapédia.
 10 November: Creation of the Parish of Saint-Marc-de-Figuery from territories taken from the Municipality of Figuery-et-Dalquier and the Township of Landrienne.
 20 November: Creation of the Parish of Saint-Mathieu-de-Dixville from territories taken from the Municipality of Saint-Herménégilde and the Township of Barford.
 30 November: Creation of the Village of Lavaltrie from territories taken from the Parish of Saint-Antoine-de-la-Valtrie.
 22 December: Creation of the Village of Saint-Pacôme from territories taken from the Parish of Saint-Pacôme.

1927 
 1 January: The Municipality of Tadoussac became the Parish of Sacré-Coeur-de-Jésus.
 1 April:
Creation of the Town of Dolbeau from territories taken from the Municipality of Saint-Michel-de-Mistassini.
Creation of the Town of Mercier.
The Village of Rouyn became a Town.
 30 July: The Municipality of Saint-Charles-de-Charlesbourg changed its name to Charlesbourg-Est.
 12 September:
Creation of the Municipality of Carleton-sur-Mer from territories taken from the Township of Carleton.
Creation of the Municipality of Roquemaure from territories taken from the Municipality of Saint-Jacques-de-Dupuy, the United Townships of La Reine-et-Desmeloizes and other unorganized territories.
 15 September: Creation of the Municipality of Grande-Vallée.
 27 September: Creation of the Village of Henryville from territories taken from the Parish of Saint-Georges.
 30 September: Creation of the Village of Prévost from territories taken from the Parish of Saint-Sauveur.
 12 November: The Parish of Saint-Pierre-de-la-Pointe-aux-Esquimaux became the Municipality of Havre-Saint-Pierre.

1928 
 11 January: Creation of the Village of Causapscal from territories taken from the Parish of Saint-Jacques-le-Majeur-de-Causapscal.
 13 March: Creation of the Village of Sainte-Marthe from territories taken from the Parish of Sainte-Marthe.
 22 March: Creation of the Town of Racine from territories taken from the Parish of Saint-Dominique-de-Jonquières and the Township of Tremblay.
 16 April: Creation of the Parish of Saint-Michel-du-Squatec.
 28 April: Creation of the Parish of Notre-Dame-du-Saint-Rosaire from territories taken from the Parish of Saint-Joachim and the Parish of Sainte-Anne-de-Beaupré.
 8 September: The Parish of Notre-Dame-du-Saint-Rosaire became the Municipality of Beaupré.
 11 September: Creation of the Municipality of Mont-Saint-Michel from territories taken from the Township of Décarie and the United Townships of Wurtele-Moreau-et-Gravel.
 19 October: Creation of the Municipality of Pointe-du-Lac from territories taken from the Municipality of Pointe-du-Lac.

1929 
 1 January: The Village of Amiante is annexed by the City of Thetford Mines.
 18 March: Creation of the Municipality of Saint-François-de-Pabos from territories taken from the Municipality of Pabos.
 27 April: The Township of Watford West became the Municipality of Saint-Prosper.
 25 June: Creation of the Village of Abercorn from territories taken from the Township of Sutton.
 13 July: The Village of Saint-Paul changed its name to Saint-Pierre.
 5 August: Creation of the Municipality of Grande-Entrée from territories taken from the Municipality of Grosse-Île.
 6 August: Creation of the Village of Saint-Évariste-Station from territories taken from the Municipality of Saint-Évariste-de-Forsyth.
 14 September: Creation of the Municipality of Taschereau from territories taken from the Township of Privat.
 23 September: Creation of the Municipality of Saint-Jacques-de-Leeds from territories taken from the Township of Leeds.
 28 September: Creation of the Municipality of Saint-Émile from territories taken from the Parish of Saint-Ambroise.
 19 October: 
Creation of the Village of Grandes-Bergeronnes from territories taken from the Township of Bergeronnes.
Creation of the Village of Valcourt from territories taken from the Township of Ely.
 9 November: Creation of the Municipality of Grande-Cascapédia from territories taken from the Township of New Richmond.

1930 
 18 January: The United Townships of Wurtele-Moreau-et-Gravel became the Parish of Ferme-Neuve.
 8 February: The Township of Kensington became the Municipality of Déléage.
 4 April:
Creation of the Town of Beauceville-Est from territories taken from the Town of Beauceville.
The Town of Chicoutimi became a City.
 14 April: Creation of the Municipality of Palmarolle from territories taken from the Township of La Sarre and other unorganized territoires.
 15 April: Creation of the Municipality of Shipshaw from territories taken from the Township of Tremblay.
 10 May: 
The Municipality of Est-de-la-Paroisse-de-Sainte-Flore is annexed by the City of Grand-Mère.
Creation of the Municipality of Nicolet-Sud from territories taken from the Parish of Saint-Jean-Baptiste-de-Nicolet.
Creation of the Village of Albanel from territories taken from the Township of Albanel.
 23 May:
Creation of the Village of Lac-Bouchette from territories taken from the Municipality of Saint-Thomas-d’Aquin.
Creation of the Village of Plage-Laval from territories taken from the Municipality of Sainte-Rose.
 31 May: The Township of Maniwaki became a Village.
 2 August: Creation of the Municipality of Sainte-Monique from territories taken from the Municipality of Saint-Henri-de-Taillon.
 6 September: Creation of the Municipality of Sainte-Thérèse-de-Gaspé from territories taken from the Municipality of Anse-du-Cap.
 15 October: Creation of the Municipality of La Manaza from territories taken from the Township of Marchand.
 20 December: Creation of the Village of Mistassini from territories taken from the Municipality of Saint-Michel-de-Mistassini.

1931 
 25 April: The Municipality of Lacaille changed its name to Bellerive.
 9 May: Creation of the Village of Saint-Joseph-de-la-Rive from territories taken from the Parish of L’Assomption-de-la-Sainte-Vierge.
 16 May: The Municipality of Bouchette-Sud changed its name to Blue Sea.
 21 May: The Village of Sacré-Cœur-de-Jésus became the Municipality of East Broughton.
 4 July: The Township of Saint-Paul-de-Mille-Vaches became the Municipality Saint-Paul-du-Nord.
 11 July: The Village of Cowansville became a Town.
 25 July: The Village of Sainte-Cécile is annexed by the City of Salaberry-de-Valleyfield.
 10 October: Creation of the Village of Maskinongé from territories taken from the Municipality of Maskinongé.
 24 October:
Creation of the Municipality of Métabetchouan from territories taken from the Parish of Saint-Louis-de-Chambord.
The Parish of Saint-Octave-de-Métis became the Municipality of Grand-Métis.
The Municipality of Saint-Octave-de-Métis-Sud became the Parish of Saint-Octave-de-Métis.
Creation of the Municipality of Saint-Stanislas from territories taken from the Municipality of Saint-Michel-de-Mistassini and other unorganized territories.
The Parish of Cœur-Très-Pur-de-la-Bienheureuse-Vierge-Marie-de-Plaisance became the Municipality of Plaisance.
 31 October: Creation of the Village of Avenir from territories taken from the Municipality of L'Avenir.
 19 December: Creation of the Village of Grande-Rivière from territories taken from the Municipality of Grande-Rivière.
 26 December: The Municipality of Talon changed its name to Lac-Frontière.

1932 
 2 January: Creation of the Municipality of Mont-Lebel from territories taken from the Parish of Sainte-Blandine.
 23 January: Creation of the Municipality of Ogden from territories taken from the Township of Stanstead.
 6 February: 
Creation of the Municipality of Grande-Île from territories taken from the Municipality of Nouveau-Salaberry.
Creation of the Municipality of Saint-Agricole from territories taken from the Township of Wolfe.
 19 February: 
The Municipality of Jeanne-d’Arc is annexed by the Municipality of Sainte-Monique.
The Municipality of Metgermette-Nord changed its name to Sainte-Aurélie.
The Village of Plage-Laval became a Town.
The Township of Metgermette-Nord became the Municipality of Saint-Zacharie.
 16 April:
The Parish of Saint-Louis-de-Chambord became the Village of Chambord.
The Township of MacNider became the Municipality of Baie-des-Sables.
 11 June: Creation of the Municipality of Petite-Rivière-Ouest from territories taken from the Municipality of Grande-Rivière.
 16 July: Creation of the Municipality of Stanstead-Est from territories taken from the Township of Stanstead.
 29 October: Creation of the Municipality of Saint-Félix-de-Dalquier from territories taken from the United Townships of Figuery-et-Dalquier.
 12 November: The Municipality of Petite-Rivière-Ouest changed its name to Grande-Rivière-Ouest.
 24 November: The Municipality of Bishop's Crossing changed its name to Bishopton.

1933 
 21 January: Creation of the Municipality of Taschereau-Fortier from territories taken from the Parish of Saint-Maxime.
 4 February: Creation of the Municipality of Saint-François-Ouest from territories taken from the Parish of Saint-François.
 11 March:
Creation of the Municipality of Bridgeville from territories taken from the Municipality of Percé and the Parish of Saint-Pierre-de-la-Malbaie-Numéro-Un.
Creation of the Village of Saint-Sébastien from territories taken from the Township of Aylmer.
 13 April: 
Creation of the Town of Duparquet.
Creation of the Town of Val-Saint-Michel from territories taken from the Parish of Saint-Gérard-Magella.
 5 August: The Township of Fox became the Municipality of Rivière-au-Renard.
 9 September: Creation of the Parish of Saint-Adelme from territories taken from the Municipality of Matane and the Parish of Sainte-Félicité.
 18 November: Creation of the Village of Gatineau from territories taken from the Municipality of Templeton-Ouest.

1934 
 13 February: The Municipality of Métabetchouan became the Parish of Saint-Louis-de-Chambord.
 20 April: Creation of the Town of Bourlamaque.

1935 
 16 February: Creation of the Municipality of Clermont from territories taken from the Parish of Saint-Étienne-de-Murray-Bay and the Parish of Sainte-Agnès.
 6 March: Creation of the Parish of Saint-Denis-de-Brompton from territories taken from the Parish of Saint-Élie-d’Orford, the Parish of Saint-François-Xavier-de-Brompton, the Township of Brompton and the Township of Orford.
 11 April: Creation of the Township of De Sales.
 13 April: The Municipality of Anse-du-Cap changed its name to Cap-d’Espoir.
 18 June: The Village of Sainte-Geneviève is annexed by the Village of Sainte-Geneviève-de-Pierrefonds.
 13 July: Creation of the Village of Brownsburg from territories taken from the Township of Chatham.
 31 August: Creation of the Village of Val-d’Or.
 14 September: Creation of the Village of Stukely-Sud from territories taken from the Municipality of South-Stukely.

1936 
 10 January: The Town of Drummondville became a City.
 4 March: Creation of the Township of Clermont.
 21 March: Creation of the Village of Saint-Augustin from territories taken from the Parish of Saint-Augustin.
 23 May: Creation of the Municipality of Saint-Bernard-de-l’Île-aux-Coudres from territories taken from the Parish of Saint-Louis-de-l’Isle-aux-Coudres.
 10 June: Creation of the Town of Lac-Saint-Joseph from territories taken from the Parish of Sainte-Catherine.
 15 August: Creation of the Municipality of Duhamel from territories taken from the United Townships of Hartwell-et-Preston.
 31 October: Creation of the Municipality of Grantham-Ouest from territories taken from the Township of Grantham.
 21 November: Creation of the Municipality of Hope-Est from territories taken from the Township of Hope.

1937 
 21 January: Creation of the Municipality of Sacré-Coeur-de-Jésus-Village from territories taken from the Parish of Sacré-Coeur-de-Jésus.
 30 January: Creation of the Municipality of Beauport-Ouest from territories taken from the Municipality of Beauport.
 6 March: Creation of the Village of La Sarre from territories taken from the Township of La Sarre.
 8 May: The Village of Asbestos became a Town.
 20 May:
Creation of the Town of Baie-Comeau.
The Village of Val-d'Or became a Town.
 31 July: Creation of the Municipality of Saint-Paul-de-Châteauguay from territories taken from the Parish of Sainte-Martine.
 7 August: Creation of the Municipality of Ascot-Nord from territories taken from the Township of Ascot.
 19 August: The Village of Saint-Joseph-de-Grantham became a Town.
 18 September: Creation of the Municipality of Saint-Simon-de-Drummond from territories taken from the Township of Grantham and the Township of Wickham.
 30 October: Creation of the Parish of Sainte-Catherine-d’Alexandrie-de-Laprairie from territories taken from the Municipality of Laprairie and the Parish of Saint-Constant.
 13 November:
Creation of the Municipality of Sainte-Sophie from territories taken from the Township of Halifax-Nord.
Creation of the Parish of Tadoussac from territories taken from the Parish of Sacré-Coeur-de-Jésus.
 4 December: Creation of the Parish of Saint-Tharcisius from territories taken from the Parish of Saint-Benoît-Joseph-Labre and other unorganized territories.
 28 December: The Village of Saint-Jérôme-de-Matane became the Town of Matane.

1938 
 19 February: Creation of the Parish of Saint-Janvier.
 14 May: 
Creation of the Municipality of Grand-Saint-Esprit from territories taken from the Parish of Sainte-Monique.
Creation of the Parish of Saint-Lambert from territories taken from the United Townships of La Reine-et-Desmeloizes.
 11 June: Creation of the Parish of Saint-Marc-du-Lac-Long.
 30 July: The Municipality of Roquemaure changed its name to Sainte-Jeanne-de-Clerval.
 3 September: Creation of the Municipality of Saint-Edmond from territories taken from the Municipality of Saint-Thomas-Didyme, the Township of Normandin and other unorganized territories.
 5 November: Creation of the Municipality of Austin from territories taken from the Municipality of Bolton-Est.
 19 November:
Creation of the Municipality of Rivière-Malbaie from territories taken from the Parish of Saint-Étienne-de-Murray-Bay.
Creation of the Municipality of Saint-Elzéar from territories taken from the Municipality of Saint-David-d’Escourt and the Parish of Saint-Louis-du-Ha! Ha!.
Creation of the Municipality of Sainte-Clothilde-de-Beauce from territories taken from the Municipality of Saint-Éphrem-de-Tring, the Municipality of Saint-Victor-de-Tring, the Parish of Sacré-Cœur-de-Jésus and the Parish of Sacré-Cœur-de-Marie.
 26 November: Creation of the Municipality of Saint-Joseph-de-Beauce from territories taken from the Parish of Saint-Joseph-de-la-Beauce.

1939 
 21 January: Creation of the Village of Les Becquets from territories taken from the Parish of Saint-Pierre-les-Becquets.
 28 January: Creation of the Village of Deschaillons-sur-Saint-Laurent from territories taken from the Village of Deschaillons.
 16 March: Creation of the Municipality of Saint-Benoît-du-Lac from territories taken from the Municipality of Austin.
 30 March: The Village of Fermont is annexed by the Parish of Saint-Maurice.
 1 April: Creation of the Municipality of Val-Saint-Gilles from territories taken from the Township of Clermont.
 28 April: Creation of the Town of Malartic.
 29 April: Creation of the Village of Saint-Pascal from territories taken from the Parish of Saint-Paschal-de-Kamouraska.
 27 May: 
Creation of the Municipality of Saint-Étienne-de-Bolton from territories taken from the Municipality of Bolton-Est.
Creation of the Municipality of Saint-Gabriel-Lalemant from territories taken from the Parish of Saint-Pacôme.
 17 June: Creation of the Village of Rimouski-Est from territories taken from the Town of Rimouski and the Parish of Saint-Anaclet-de-Lessard.
 23 June: The Township of Howard became the Municipality of Saint-Adolphe-d’Howard.
 19 August: Creation of the Municipality of Grosses-Roches from territories taken from the Parish of Sainte-Félicité.

1940 
 2 March: The Municipality of Partie-Sud-du-Canton-de-Masham changed its name to Sainte-Cécile-de-Masham.
 17 May: Creation of the Municipality of Mont-Tremblant from territories taken from the Township of Clyde and the United Townships of DeSalaberry-et-Grandison.
 1 June: The Township of Armand became the Municipality of Saint-Honoré.
 8 June: Creation of the Village of Saint-Sylvère from territories taken from the Parish of Saint-Sylvère.
 27 July: Creation of the Village of Norbertville from territories taken from the Parish of Saint-Norbert-d’Arthabaska.
 26 October: Creation of the Municipality of Chute-Saint-Philippe from territories taken from the Parish of Ferme-Neuve and other unorganized territories.
 21 December: Creation of the Village of Cadillac and the Village of Pascalis.

1941 
 4 January: Creation of the Village of La Patrie from territories taken from the Township of Ditton.
 20 March: Creation of the Town of Ville-des-Iles-Laval from territories taken from the Parish of Sainte-Dorothée.
 10 May: Creation of the Parish of Sainte-Hélène-de-Mancebourg.
 20 September: Creation of the Village of Saint-Félix from territories taken from the Municipality of Grantham-Ouest.
 15 November: The Village of Saint-Félix is annexed by the Municipality of Grantham-Ouest.

1942 
 1 January: 
Re-Creation of the Village of Saint-Félix from territories taken from the Municipality of Grantham-Ouest.
Creation of the Parish of Sainte-Rose-du-Nord from territories taken from the Parish of Saint-Fulgence.
 29 May: 
The Town of Berthier changed its name to Berthierville.
Creation of the Town of Oka-sur-le-Lac from territories taken from the Municipality of L’Annonciation.
 27 June: The Township of Grantham became the Municipality of Saint-Jean-Baptiste.
 29 August: The Municipality of Nord-Est-des-Cantons-de-Wabassee-Dudley-et-Bouthiller changed its name to Nord-Est-des-Cantons-Dudley-et-Bouthiller.
 26 December: The Village of Saint-Joseph became the Town of Saint-Joseph-de-Sorel.

1943 
 1 January: 
Creation of the Village of Saint-Georges-Ouest from territories taken from the Parish of Saint-Georges.
Creation of the Parish of Saint-Mathieu from territoires taken from the United Townships of Figuery-et-Dalquier and other unorganized territories.
Creation of the Parish of Sainte-Odile-sur-Rimouski from territories taken from the Parish of Saint-Germain-de-Rimouski.
 3 July: The Village of Saint-Félix changed its name to Drummondville-Ouest.

1944 
 1 January:
Creation of the Municipality of Saint-Janvier-de-Joly from territories taken from the Parish of Saint-Édouard-de-Lotbinière.
Creation of the Village of Naudville from territories taken from the Municipality of Saint-Joseph-d’Alma.
 22 January: The Town of Racine is annexed by the City of Arvida.
 26 February: The Township of Wolfe became the Municipality of Saint-Faustin.
 4 May: Creation of the Town of Forestville from territories taken from the United Townships of Sainte-Anne-de-Portneuf.
 30 June: 
The Municipality of Durham changed its name to Ulverton.
The Village of Saint-Jean-Baptiste-de-Bélisle changed its name to Val-David.
 14 October: The Municipality of Cap-des-Rosiers changed its name to Grande-Grève.
 21 October: The Municipality of Nouveau-Salaberry is annexed by the City of Salaberry-de-Valleyfield.
 10 November: The Township of Wickham became the Municipality of Saint-Nicéphore.

1945 
 1 January: 
Creation of the Municipality of Normétal from territories taken from the Municipality of Saint-Jacques-de-Dupuy and the Parish of Saint-Lambert.
Creation of the Village of Crabtree from territories taken from the Parish of Sacré-Cœur-de-Jésus.
Creation of the Parish of Saint-René.
 20 January: The Municipality of Beauport changed its name to Sainte-Thérèse-de-Lisieux.
 7 April: The United Townships of Wabassee-Dudley-et-Bouthillier became the Municipality of Notre-Dame-de-Pontmain.
 24 May: The Village of Petit-Lac-Magog changed its name to Deauville.
 2 June: The Village of Priceville changed its name to Price.
 16 June: The Village of Saint-Moïse changed its name to Saint-Noël.
 30 June: The Parish of Saint-Méthode-d'Adstock became the Municipality of Saint-Méthode-de-Frontenac.
 1 July: The Village of Mont-Joli became a Town.

1946 
 1 January:
Creation of the Municipality of Barnston-Ouest from territories taken from the Township of Barnston.
Creation of the Municipality of Colombier from territories taken from the United Townships of Sainte-Anne-de-Portneuf.
Creation of the Municipality of Saint-Jean-de-Brébeuf from territories taken from the Municipality of Inverness, the Township of Halifax-Sud, the Township of Ireland-Nord and the Township of Leeds.
Creation of the Municipality of Sainte-Thérèse-de-la-Gatineau from territories taken from the Township of Cameron.
Creation of the Municipality of Sainte-Thérèse-Ouest from territories taken from the Parish of Sainte-Thérèse-de-Blainville.
Creation of the Village of Saint-Germain-de-Grantham from territories taken from the Parish of Saint-Germain.
 2 February: The United Townships of Bigelow-Wells-Blake-et-McGill became the Municipality of Notre-Dame-du-Laus.
 9 February: The Township of Somerset-Sud became the Parish of Plessisville.
 28 March: The Parish of Sainte-Jeanne-Chantal-de-l'Isle-Perrot changed its name to Île-Perrot.
 27 April: The Township of Clyde became the Municipality of La Conception.
 22 June: The Village of Montmorency became a Town.
 1 July: Creation of the Parish of Sainte-Anne-des-Lacs from territories taken from the Parish of Saint-Sauveur.
 24 August: The Municipality of Saint-Joseph-de-Beauce changed its name to Saint-Joseph-des-Érables.
 31 August: The Township of Clifton became the Municipality of Martinville.
 5 October: The Parish of Sainte-Théodosie changed its name to Sainte-Théodosie-Calixa-Lavallée.
 26 October: The Village of Saint-Félicien became a Town.
 16 November: The Village of Gatineau became a Town.

1947 
 1 January: 
Creation of the Municipality of Biencourt.
Creation of the Municipality of Douville from territories taken from the Parish of Saint-Hyacinthe.
Creation of the Municipality of Lac-Saint-Charles from territories taken from the Parish of Notre-Dame-des-Laurentides.
Creation of the Municipality of Sainte-Françoise from territories taken from the Municipality of Villeroy and the Parish of Sainte-Philomène-de-Fortierville.
Creation of the Municipality of Shannon from territories taken from the Parish of Sainte-Catherine.
Creation of the Village of Mont-Saint-Pierre from territories taken from the Municipality of Saint-Maxime-du-Mont-Louis.
Creation of the Village of Saint-Fulgence from territories taken from the Parish of Saint-Fulgence.
Creation of the Village of Saint-Grégoire-de-Greenlay from territories taken from the Parish of Saint-François-Xavier-de-Brompton.
Creation of the Village of Sainte-Dorothée from territories taken from the Parish of Sainte-Dorothée.
Creation of the Village of Sault-au-Mouton from territories taken from the Municipality of Saint-Paul-du-Nord.
Creation of the Parish of Rosemère from territories taken from the Parish of Sainte-Thérèse-de-Blainville.
Creation of the Parish of Saint-Georges-Est from territories taken from the Parish of Saint-Georges.
 1 February: The Village of Saint-Faustin-Station changed its name to Lac-Carré.
 20 March: Creation of the Village of Parent.
 26 April: The Village of Loretteville became a Town.
 10 May:
The Municipality of Pont-Viau became a Town.
The Village of L'Abord-à-Plouffe became a Town.
The Parish of Longueuil is split into the Town of Jacques-Cartier and the Town of Mackayville.
The Parish of Saint-Colomb-de-Sillery became the City of Sillery.
 7 June: The Township of Bégon became the Municipality of Saint-Jean-de-Dieu.
 18 October: The Municipality of Sainte-Florence-de-Beaurivage changed its name to Sainte-Florence.
 29 November: The Village of Mistassini became a Town.
 13 December: The Municipality of Ouest-du-Canton-de-la-Motte changed its name to La Motte.

1948 
 1 January: 
Creation of the Municipality of Évain.
Creation of the Municipality of Lac-des-Aigles.
Creation of the Municipality of Lantier from territories taken from the Township of Doncaster.
Creation of the Municipality of Lesage from territories taken from the Municipality of Saint-Jérôme, the Village of Shawbridge and the Township of Abercrombie.
Creation of the Municipality of Raudot.
Creation of the Municipality of Saint-David-de-Falardeau from territories taken from the Parish of Saint-Honoré.
Creation of the Municipality of Saint-Jacques-de-Horton from territories taken from the Parish of Sainte-Clothilde-de-Horton.
Creation of the Municipality of Saint-Ludger-de-Milot.
Creation of the Village of Barraute from territories taken from the United Townships of Fiedmont-et-Barraute.
Creation of the Village of Notre-Dame-de-Lorette from territories taken from the Parish of Ancienne-Lorette.
Creation of the Village of Saint-Basile-Sud from territories taken from the Parish of Saint-Basile.
The Parish of Île-Perrot is split into the Municipality of Île-Perrot-Nord and the Parish of Notre-Dame-de-l'Île-Perrot.
 The Township of Senneterre became a Village.
 7 February: The Township of De Sales became the Municipality of Notre-Dame-des-Monts.
 11 March:
Creation of the City of Rouyn by the merger of the Town of Mercier and the Town of Rouyn.
Creation of the Town of Préville from territories taken from the Town of Jacques-Cartier.
The Village of Cadillac became a Town.
The Village of Saint-Eustache became a Town.
 22 March: 
The Town of Beauharnois became a City.
The Town of Noranda became a City.
 17 April: The Village of Est-de-Saint-Georges-de-Beauce became the Town of Saint-Georges.
 29 May: The Village of Saint-Benoît-Joseph-Labre changed its name to Amqui.
 1 June: 
Creation of the Town of Châteauguay Heights from territories taken from the Town of Châteauguay.
Creation of the Municipality of Milan from territories taken from the Municipality of Winslow-Sud, the Township of Hampden, the Township of Lingwick, the Township of Marston and the Township of Whitton.
 1 July: Creation of the Municipality of Lanoraie-d'Autray from territories taken from the Parish of Saint-Joseph-de-Lanoraie.
 18 September: 
The Village of Almaville changed its name to Shawinigan-Sud.
The Village of Saint-Georges-Ouest became a Town.
The Parish of Saint-Malachie-de-Frampton changed its name to Saint-Malachie.
 13 November: The Township of Bois became the Municipality of Rivière-à-Pierre.

1949 
 1 January: 
The Municipality of Clermont became a Village.
Creation of the Municipality of Saint-Jules from territories taken from the Township of Maria and other unorganized territories.
Creation of the Municipality of Saint-Médard.
Creation of the Municipality of Saint-Robert-Bellarmin from territories taken from the Parish of Saint-Gédéon and the United Townships of Risborough-et-Marlow.
Creation of the Village of Notre-Dame-du-Lac from territories taken from the Parish of Notre-Dame-du-Lac.
Creation of the Village of Saint-Maurice-de-Bois-Filion from territories taken from the Municipality of Terrebonne and the Parish of Sainte-Thérèse-de-Blainville.
Creation of the Village of Sainte-Jeanne-d’Arc from territories taken from the Parish of Sainte-Jeanne-d’Arc.
Creation of the Village of Sainte-Rosalie from territories taken from the Parish of Sainte-Rosalie.
Creation of the Parish of Saint-Antoine-des-Laurentides from territories taken from the Municipality of Saint-Jérôme.
 26 February: The United Townships of La Reine-et-Desmeloizes became the Municipality of La Reine.
 10 March: 
Creation of the Town of LeMoyne from territories taken from the Town of Jacques-Cartier.
Creation of the Village of Fossambault-sur-le-Lac from territories taken from the Parish of Sainte-Catherine.
The Parish of Saint-Foye became the Town of Sainte-Foy.
 9 April: The Parish of Tadoussac is closed and dissolved.
 23 April: The Parish of Saint-Jean-Baptiste-des-Écureuils became the Municipality of Les Écureuils.
 30 April: The Village of Saint-Maurice-de-Bois-Filion changed its name to Bois-des-Filions.
 18 June: The United Townships of Figuery-et-Dalquier became the Municipality of Amos-Ouest.
 1 July:
Creation of the Village of Sainte-Anne-du-Lac from territories taken from the Parish of Sacré-Cœur-de-Marie.
Creation of the Parish of Lac-Paré from territories taken from the Township of Chertsey.
 9 July: The Village of Saint-Évariste-Station changed its name to Guadeloupe.
 10 September: The Village of Enfant-Jésus became the Municipality of Vallée-Jonction.
 17 September: The Village of La Sarre became a Town.
 5 November: The Village of Charlesbourg became a City.
 12 November: The Village of Saint-Rémi became a Town.
 24 December: The Township of Senneterre became a Parish.

1950 
 1 January: 
Creation of the Municipality of Compton-Station from territories taken from the Township of Compton.
Creation of the Municipality of Lac-des-Plages from territories taken from the Township of Amherst and the United Townships of Suffolk-et-Addington.
Creation of the Municipality of Mont-Saint-Hilaire from territories taken from the Parish of Saint-Hilaire.
Creation of the Municipality of Notre-Dame-de-la-Merci.
Creation of the Municipality of Saint-Aimé-des-Lacs from territories taken from the Municipality of Notre-Dame-des-Monts and the Parish of Saint-Agnès.
Creation of the Municipality of Saint-François-Xavier-de-Viger from territories taken from the Parish of Saint-Épiphane and the Parish of Saint-Hubert.
Creation of the Municipality of Saint-Luc-de-Laval from territories taken from the United Townships of Sainte-Anne-de-Portneuf.
Creation of the Municipality of Sainte-Félicité from territories taken from the Municipality of Saint-Pamphile, the Municipality of Sainte-Perpétue and the United Townships of Casgrain-et-Leverrier.
Creation of the Municipality of Val-Alain from territories taken from the Parish of Sainte-Emmélie-de-Lotbinière.
Creation of the Municipality of Venise-en-Québec from territories taken from the Parish of Saint-Georges-de-Clarenceville.
Creation of the Village of Armagh from territories taken from the Parish of Saint-Cajetan-d’Armagh.
Creation of the Village of Cap-aux-Meules from territories taken from the Municipality of Étang-du-Nord.
Creation of the Village of L’Islet-Station from territories taken from the Municipality of Islet.
Creation of the Village of Marsoui from territories taken from the Municipality of Christie and the Municipality of Duchesnay.
The Village of Mont-Laurier became a Town.
Creation of the Village of Pincourt from territories taken from the Parish of Notre-Dame-de-l'Île-Perrot.
Creation of the Village of Saint-Gédéon from territories taken from the Parish of Saint-Gédéon.
Creation of the Village of Saint-Placide from territories taken from the Parish of Saint-Placide.
Creation of the Village of Sainte-Anne-du-Lac from territories taken from the Township of Décarie.
 29 March: 
Creation of the Town of Hauterive.
Creation of the Municipality of La Rochelle from territories taken from the Municipality of Tingwick.
The Parish of Saint-Léonard-de-Port-Maurice became the Municipality of Saint-Léonard-de-Portneuf.
 1 April: The Township of Morin became the Municipality of Morin-Heights.
 5 April:
The Town of Magog became a City.
The Town of Saint-Jérôme became a City.
 6 May: The Parish of Sainte-Rose-de-Lima changed its name to Sainte-Rose-Est.
 8 July: The Municipality of Figuery-et-Dalquier changed its name to Amos-Est.
 25 November: The Township of Somerset-Nord became the Municipality of Sainte-Julie.

1951 
 1 January: 
The Town of Plage-Laval changed its name to Laval-Ouest.
Creation of the Municipality of Havre-Aubert-Est from territories taken from the Municipality of Havre-Aubert.
Creation of the Municipality of La Baleine from territories taken from the Parish of Saint-Louis-de-l’Isle-aux-Coudres.
Creation of the Municipality of La Nativité-de-Laprairie from territories taken from the Municipality of Laprairie.
Creation of the Municipality of Lac-Édouard.
Creation of the Village of Aston-Jonction from territories taken from the Parish of Saint-Raphaël.
Creation of the Village of Deschambault from territories taken from the Municipality of Deschambault.
Creation of the Village of Laurier-Station from territories taken from the Parish of Saint-Flavien.
 17 February: The United Townships of Fiedmont-et-Barraute became a Municipality.
 7 March: Creation of the Village of Chute-aux-Outardes and the Parish of Ragueneau from territories taken from the Municipality of Sept-Cantons-Unis-de-Saguenay.
 14 March: Creation of the Town of Sept-Îles from territories taken from the Township of Letellier.
 17 March: The Parish of Notre-Dame-de-Bonsecours became the Municipality of Fassett.
 28 April: The Municipality of Sainte-Jeanne-de-Clerval changed its name to Clerval.
 12 May: The Municipality of Saindon became the Village of Sayabec.
 16 June: The Village of Beauport-Est changed its name to Villeneuve.
 27 October: The Township of Abercrombie became the Parish of Saint-Hippolyte.
 19 December: 
The Town of Jacques-Cartier became a City.
The Town of Lauzon became a City.
The Village of Côte-Saint-Luc became a Town.

1952 
 1 January:
Creation of the Municipality of Fleuriault from territories taken from the Parish of Saint-Gabriel.
Creation of the Municipality of Les Boules from territories taken from the Municipality of Baie-des-Sables and the Parish of Saint-Octave-de-Métis.
Creation of the Municipality of Pabos Mills from territories taken from the Municipality of Newport and the Municipality of Pabos.
Creation of the Municipality of Roquemaure.
Creation of the Municipality of Saint-Jean-Baptiste-de-l’Isle-Verte from territories taken from the Municipality of Isle-Verte.
Creation of the Municipality of Terrasse-Vaudreuil from territories taken from the Parish of Notre-Dame-de-l'Île-Perrot.
Creation of the Village of Ayersville from territories taken from the Township of Chatham.
Creation of the Village of Saint-Damase from territories taken from the Parish of Saint-Damase.
Creation of the Village of Saint-Jean-Vianney from territories taken from the Municipality of Shipshaw.
 23 January: 
Creation of the Town of Saint-Vincent-de-Paul from territories taken from the Municipality of Saint-Vincent-de-Paul.
The Village of Chambly became the Town of Fort-Chambly.
 9 March: The Town of Ville-Saint-Michel became the City of Saint-Michel.
 10 May: The United Townships of Royal-Roussillon-et-Poularies became the Municipality of Royal-Roussillon-de-Macamic.
 27 September: The United Townships of Dalibaire-et-Romieu became the Municipality of Les Méchins.
 25 October: The Village of Bassin-de-Chambly became the Town of Chambly.
 31 October: The Municipality of Laprairie changed its name to Notre-Dame.
 8 November: Creation of the Village of Chibougamau.
 6 December: The Municipality of La-Nativité-de-Laprairie became the Parish of Laprairie.

1953 
 1 January: 
Creation of the Municipality of Charlesbourg-Ouest from territories taken from the Parish of Charlesbourg.
Creation of the Municipality of Sainte-Monique-des-Saules from territories taken from the Parish of Ancienne-Lorette.
Creation of the Village of Lac-à-la-Croix from territories taken from the Parish of Sainte-Croix.
Creation of the Village of Omerville from territories taken from the Township of Magog.
Creation of the Village of Saint-Honoré from territories taken from the Parish of Saint-Honoré.
Creation of the Village of Shawinigan-Est from territories taken from the Parish of Sainte-Flore.
Creation of the Parish of Sainte-Irène from territories taken from the Parish of Saint-Benoît-Joseph-Labre and other unorganized territories.
 31 January: The Parish of Saint-Hilaire became the Municipality of Otterburn Park.
 12 February: Creation of the Village of Pointe-Calumet from territories taken from the Parish of Saint-Joseph.
 21 March:
The Municipality of Nord-Est-des-Cantons-Dudley-et-Bouthiller changed its name to Saint-Aimé-du-Lac-des-Îles.
The Parish of Annonciation became the Municipality of Oka.
 28 March: The Township of Campbell became the Municipality of Brunet.
 2 May:
The Village of Lac-Saint-Louis changed its name to Melocheville.
The Parish of Sainte-Anne-de-Stukely became the Municipality of Sainte-Anne-de-la-Rochelle.
 23 May: The Township of Est-du-Canton-de-Campbell became the Municipality of Lac-des-Écorces.
 20 June: The Village of Saint-Alexis-de-la-Grande-Baie is annexed by the Town of Port-Alfred.
 4 July: The Parish of Charlesbourg changed its name to Orsainville.
 18 July: Creation of the Town of Murdochville.
 25 July: The Parish of Saint-Pierre-de-la-Malbaie-Numéro-Un became the Municipality of Barachois.
 15 August: The Township of Romieux became the Municipality of Capucins.
 12 September: The Municipality of D'Israëli became the Parish of Disreali.
 19 September: Creation of the Town of Barville from territories taken from the Municipality of Fiedmont-et-Barraute.
 3 October: The Township of Lussier became the Municipality of Saint-Donat.
 24 October:
The Municipality of Musselyville changed its name to Saint-Alphonse.
The Municipality of Portland changed its name to Portland-Ouest.
 28 November:
The Municipality of Hope-Est changed its name to Hope Town.
The Village of D'Israëli changed its name to Disraeli.
 5 December: 
The Municipality of Partie-Ouest-du-Canton-de-Douglas changed its name to Haldimand.
The Municipality of Saint-Jean-l’Evangéliste changed its name to Nouvelle.
 17 December: Creation of the Town of Saint-Martin from territories taken from the Parish of Saint-Martin.

1954 
 1 January:
Creation of the Municipality of Auclair.
Creation of the Municipality of Saint-Michel-des-Forges from territories taken from the Parish of Saint-Étienne and the Parish of Trois-Rivières.
Creation of the Municipality of Saint-Omer from territories taken from the Municipality of Saint-Pamphile and the Municipality of Sainte-Perpétue.
Creation of the Parish of Sainte-Germaine-de-Palmarolle from territories taken from the Municipality of Palmarolle and the Municipaliry of Poularies.
 28 January: The Municipality of Rivière-des-Prairies became a Town.
 10 February: 
The Village of Giffard became a City.
The Parish of La Présentation-de-la-Sainte-Vierge changed its name to Côte-de-Liesse.
The Parish of Saint-Joseph became the Town of Tracy.
 1 April: The Parish of Saint-Laurent is dissolved and its territory is split between the City of Montréal and the Town of Saint-Laurent.
 10 April: The Town of Saint-Joseph-d’Alma changed its name to Alma.
 1 May: Creation of the Parish of Saint-Jean-de-Cherbourg, the Parish of Saint-Paulin-Dalibaire and the Parish of Saint-Thomas-de-Cherbourg from territories taken from an unorganized territory formed from territories taken from the Parish of Sainte-Félicité, the former Township of Romieux and the former United Township of Dalibaire-et-Romieu.
 15 May: 
The Village of Naudville became a Town.
The Parish of Conversion-de-Saint-Paul became the Municipality of Saint-Paul.
The United Townships of Roux-Bellechasse-et-Daaquam became the Municipality of Saint-Magloire-de-Bellechasse.
 22 May: 
The Village of L’Islet-Station changed its name to Isletville.
The Village of Sainte-Anne-de-Chicoutimi became the Town of Chicoutimi-Nord.
The Parish of Sainte-Germaine-de-Palmarolle became the Municipality of Sainte-Germaine-Boulé.
 19 June: The Township of Bowman became a Municipality.
 7 August: The Municipality of Bagotville-Partie-Nord-Ouest-du-Township-de-Bagot became the Parish of Bagotville.
 1 September: The Village of Chibougamau became a Town.
 18 September: The Parish of Saint-Malachy became the Municipality of Mayo.
 31 December: The Township of Kilkenny became the Municipality of Saint-Calixte.

1955 
 1 January:
The Municipality of Isle-Verte became the Village of L’Isle-Verte.
Creation of the Municipality of Lac-du-Cerf from territories taken from the Municipality of Notre-Dame-de-Pontmain and the Municipality of Saint-Aimé-du-Lac-des-Îles.
Creation of the Municipality of Moisie from territories taken from the Township of Letellier.
Creation of the Municipality of Petit-Pabos from territories taken from the Municipality of Pabos and the Municipality of Saint-François-de-Pabos.
Creation of the Municipality of Saint-Athanase.
Creation of the Village of Baie-Trinité and the Village of Godbout from territories taken from the Municipality of Sept-Cantons-Unis-de-Saguenay.
Creation of the Village of East Broughton Station from territories taken from the Municipality of East Broughton.
Creation of the Village of Lac-des-Écorces from territories taken from the Municipality of Lac-des-Écorces.
Creation of the Village of Saint-André from territories taken from the Municipality of Saint-André.
Creation of the Village of Saint-Elzéar from territories taken from the Parish of Saint-Elzéar-de-Linière.
Creation of the Village of Saint-Grégoire from territories taken from the Parish of Saint-Grégoire-le-Grand.
Creation of the Village of Saint-Jean-Eudes from territories taken from the Municipality of Chicoutimi.
Creation of the Village of Sainte-Félicité from territories taken from the Parish of Sainte-Félicité.
Creation of the Parish of Saint-Honoré from territories taken from the Township of Shenley.
 10 February: 
The Town of Saint-Laurent became a City.
The Town of Sainte-Foy became a City.
The Municipality of Petite-Rivière became the Town of La Petite-Rivière.
The Village of Macamic became a Town.
The Village of Plessisville became a Town.
 12 February: The Town of Saint-Joseph-de-Grantham is annexed by the City of Drummondville.
 19 February: The Village of Saint-Victor-de-Tring changed its name to Saint-Victor.
 22 February: The Municipality of Île-Perrot-Nord became the Town of Île-Perrot.
 25 June: The Municipality of Saint-Jean-Baptiste is annexed by the City of Drummondville.
 16 July: The United Townships of Sainte-Anne-de-Portneuf became a Municipality.
 1 August: Creation of the Town of Schefferville.
 16 November: Creation of the Town of Chapais. 
 31 December:
The Parish of Saint-Bonaventure-de-Hamilton became the Municipality of Bonaventure.
The Township of Ashford became the Municipality of Saint-Damase-de-l'Islet.

1956 
 1 January: 
Creation of the Municipality of Petite-Matane from territories taken from the Municipality of Matane and the Parish of Sainte-Félicité.
The Municipality of Saint-Émile became a Village.
Creation of the Municipality of Sainte-Marcelline-de-Kildare from territories taken from the Parish of Saint-Ambroise-de-Kildare.
Creation of the Village of Saint-Antoine-des-Laurentides from territories taken from the Parish of Saint-Antoine-des-Laurentides.
Creation of the Parish of La Rédemption.
 21 January: 
The Village of Senneterre became a Town.
The Village of Warwick became a Town.
 2 February: 
The Town of Jonquière became a City.
The Village of Villeneuve became a Town.
The Parish of Saint-Elzéar-de-Laval became the Town of Saint-Elzéar.
 18 February: The Parish of Sainte-Brigide-de-Monnoir became the Municipality of Sainte-Brigide-d’Iberville.
 23 February:
The Town of Dorval became a City.
Creation of the Town of Mont-Gabriel from territories taken from the Parish of Saint-Sauveur and the Parish of Sainte-Adèle.
The Parish of Saint-Léonard-de-Port-Maurice became the Town of Anjou.
 25 February: The Township of Settrington became the Parish of Saint-Hilarion.
 11 August: The United Townships of Casgrain-et-Leverrier became the Municipality of Saint-Adalbert.
 18 August: The Township of Arago became the Municipality of Saint-Marcel.
 15 September: The Township of Shawenegan became the Parish of Saint-Boniface-de-Shawinigan.
 10 November: The Parish of Saint-Ours-du-Saint-Esprit changed its name to Saint-Esprit.
 15 December: 
The Municipality of Saint-Éphrem-de-Tring became the Parish of Saint-Éphrem-de-Beauce.
The Parish of L’Assomption-de-la-Sainte-Vierge became the Municipality of Les Éboulements.
 19 December: The Town of Farnham became a City.
 29 December: The Town of Roberval became a City.

1957 
 1 January: 
Creation of the Municipality of Aguanish.
Creation of the Municipality of Petite-Vallée from territories taken from the Township of Cloridorme.
Creation of the Municipality of Saint-Faustin-Sud from territories taken from the Municipality of Saint-Faustin.
Creatiion of the Municipality of Sainte-Marguerite.
Creation of the Village of Notre-Dame-du-Bon-Conseil from territories taken from the Parish of Notre-Dame-du-Bon-Conseil.
Creation of the Village of Saint-Théophile from territories taken from the Parish of Saint-Théophile-de-la-Beauce.
Creation of the Village of Sainte-Marie from territories taken from the Parish of Sainte-Marie-de-Blandford.
Creation of the Parish of Notre-Dame-des-Prairies and the Parish of Saint-Charles-Borromée-Sud from territories taken from the Parish of Saint-Charles-Borrommée-du-Village-d’Industrie.
 5 January: The Municipality of Saint-Ours became a Parish.
 21 January: The Village of Rock Island became a Town.
 31 January: 
Creation of the Town of Candiac from territories taken from the Village of Delson and the Parish of Saint-Constant.
The Parish of Repentigny became a Town.
 9 February:
The Parish of Saint-Étienne-de-Murray-Bay became the Municipality of Saint-Étienne-de-la-Malbaie.
The Parish of Saint-Joseph-de-la-Beauce changed its name to Saint-Joseph-de-Beauce.
 16 February: The Municipality of Wickham-Ouest changed its name to Wickham.
 21 February: 
The Municipality of Sainte-Rose became the Town of Fabreville.
The Village of Delson became a Town.
The Parish of Saint-Clément is annexed by the City of Beauharnois.
 9 March: The Township of Whitton became the Municipality of Nantes.
 16 March: The Parish of Saint-Paschal-de-Kamouraska became the Municipality of Saint-Pascal.
 23 March: The Parish of Saint-François became the Municipality of Saint-François-de-Beauce.
 30 March: The Parish of Saint-Charles-Borromée-Sud became the Municipality of Joliette-Sud.
 13 April: The Village of Saint-Raymond became a Town.
 18 May: The Parish of Saint-Étienne-de-Lauzon became the Municipality of Saint-Étienne.
 25 May: The Municipality of Saint-Norbert-du-Cap-Chatte became the Parish of Saint-Norbert-du-Cap-Chat.
 22 June: The Parish of Saint-Georges became the Municipality of Henryville.
 14 July: The Village of Canrobert changed its name to L'Ange-Gardien.
 27 July: The Parish of Sainte-Jeanne-de-Neuville became the Municipality of Sainte-Jeanne-de-Pont-Rouge.
 31 August: The Village of Shawinigan-Est is annexed by the City of Shawinigan-Falls.
 14 September: The Municipality of Lacorne changed its name to Sainte-Sophie.
 21 September:
The Municipality of Escoumains changed its name to Escoumins.
The Parish of Saint-Raymond-de-Pennafort-de-Weedon became the Municipality of Fontainebleau.
 16 October: The Village of Boucherville became a Town.
 26 October: The Parish of Saint-Léon-de-Marston changed its name to Val-Racine.
 16 November: The Municipality of Saint-Vincent-de-Paul changed its name to Duvernay.
 30 November: The Village of Maniwaki became a Town.
 28 December: The Municipality of Saint-Faustin changed its name to Lac-Supérieur.

1958 
 1 January: 
Creation of the Town of Pointe-du-Moulin from territories taken from the Parish of Notre-Dame-de-l'Île-Perrot.
Creation of the Municipality of Lac-Lemoine.
Creation of the Municipality of Saint-Guy.
Creation of the Municipality of Saint-Laurent from territories taken from the Municipality of Palmarolle and other unorganized territories.
Creation of the Municipality of Wentworth-Nord from territories taken from the Township of Wentworth.
Creation of the Village of Lafontaine from territories taken from the Municipality of Saint-Jérôme.
Creation of the Village of Saint-André-Est from territories taken from the Municipality of Argenteuil.
Creation of the Village of Saint-Vallier from territories taken from the Parish of Saint-Vallier.
 6 February:
The City of Shawinigan Falls changed its name to Shawinigan.
The Town of Côte-Saint-Luc became a City.
The Town of Kénogami became a City.
The Town of Pointe-aux-Trembles became a City.
The Town of Pointe-Claire became a City.
The Town of Pont-Viau became a City.
The Town of Saint-Martin became a City.
The Town of Ville-Lasalle became the City of Lasalle.
The Municipality of Duvernay became a Town.
The Municipality of Saint-François-de-Sales-Isle-Jésus became the Town of Saint-François.
The Village of Chandler became a Town.
The Village of Saint-Eustache-sur-le-Lac became a Town.
The Parish of Rosemère became a Town.
The Parish of Saint-Hubert became a Town.
 8 February: The Village of Malbaie became the Town of La Malbaie.
 14 February: 
The Town of Mégantic changed its name to Lac-Mégantic.
The Parish of Laprairie became the Town of Brossard.
 21 February: The Town of Alma became a City.
 1 April: The Parish of Côte-de-Liesse is dissolved and its territory is split between the City of Dorval, the City of Lachine and the City of Saint-Laurent.
 5 April: The Village of Sainte-Marie became a Town.
 12 April: The Parish of Saint-Raymond-Nonnat changed its name to Saint-Raymond.
 14 June: 
The Village of Danville became a Town.
The United Townships of Carpentier-et-de-Courville became the Municipality of Belcourt.
 28 June: The Village of Bois-des-Filions changed its name to Bois-des-Filion.
 23 August: The Township of Villeneuve became the Municipality of Val-des-Bois.
 6 September: The United Townships of Hartwell-et-Preston became the Parish of Chénéville.
 13 September: The Parish of Saint-Bruno-de-Montarville became a Town.
 20 September: The Township of Chesham became the Municipality of Notre-Dame-des-Bois.
 18 October: The Township of Marston-Sud became the Municipality of Piopolis.
 22 November: The Township of Aylmer became the Parish of Saint-Sébastien.
 29 November: The Parish of Notre-Dame-de-Lourdes-de-Ham became the Municipality of Massabielle.
 18 December: The Parish of Sainte-Geneviève became the Town of Pierrefonds.

1959 
 1 January: 
Creation of the Town of Port-Cartier.
Creation of the Municipality of Fatima from territories taken from the Municipality of Étang-du-Nord.
Creation of the Municipality of Saint-Janvier-de-la-Croix from territories taken from the Parish of Saint-Janvier-de-Blainville.
Creation of the Village of Saint-Bernard from territories taken from the Parish of Saint-Bernard.
Creation of the Village of Sainte-Germaine-du-Lac-Etchemin from territories taken from the Parish of Sainte-Germaine-du-Lac-Etchemin.
 10 January: The Township of Hocquart became the Municipality of Saint-Cyprien.
 31 January: The Parish of Sainte-Marie-de-la-Nouvelle-Beauce changed its name to Sainte-Marie.
 11 February: 
Creation of the Town of Lac-Delage from territories taken from the Municipality of Lac-Saint-Charles and the Municipality of Stoneham.
The Town of Sainte-Thérèse became a City.
The Town of Sept-Îles became a City.
The Village of Gaspé became a Town.
 5 March: 
Creation of the Town of Estérel from territories taken from the Parish of Sainte-Marguerite-du-Lac-Masson.
The Town of Mackayville became the City of Laflèche.
The Town of Montréal-Nord became a City.
Creation of the Town of Sainte-Dorothée by the merger of the Village of Sainte-Dorothée and the Parish of Sainte-Dorothée.
The Village of Sainte-Geneviève-de-Pierrefonds became the Town of Sainte-Geneviève.
 18 April: The United Townships of Spaulding and Ditchfield became the Municipality of Frontenac.
 9 May: The Municipality of Saint-Simon-de-Drummond changed its name to Drummondville-Sud.
 27 June: The Village of La Pointe-à-Gatineau became the Town of Pointe-Gatineau.
 5 December: The Municipality of Saint-Hubert-de-Spaulding changed its name to Audet.
 12 December:
The Municipality of Havre-Aubert changed its name to Bassin. 
The Parish of Saint-Valère-de-Bulstrode became the Municipality of Saint-Valère.

1960 
 1 January: 
Creation of the Municipality of Sainte-Marthe-sur-le-Lac from territories taken from the Municipality of Saint-Eustache.
The Village of Pincourt became a Town.
Creation of the Village of Sainte-Anne-de-la-Pocatière from territories taken from the Municipality of Sainte-Anne-de-la-Pocatière.
Creation of the Village of Sainte-Clothilde-de-Horton from territories taken from the Parish of Sainte-Clothilde-de-Horton.
 23 January: The Municipality of Templeton-Nord changed its name to Perkins.
 30 January: The Town of Baie-d'Urfée changed its name to Baie-D'Urfé.
 4 February:
Creation of the Town of Gagnon.
Creation of the Town of Lorraine from territories taken from the Village of Bois-des-Filion and the Parish of Sainte-Thérèse-de-Blainville.
The Municipality of Dollard-des-Ormeaux became a Town.
The Parish of Saint-Joachim-de-Châteauguay became the Town of Châteauguay-Centre.
 6 February: The Parish of Saint-Fortunat-de-Wolfestown became the Municipality of Saint-Fortunat.
 10 March: The Municipality of Sainte-Monique-des-Saules became the Town of Ville-Les Saules.
 12 March:
The Village of Belle-Plage changed its name to Vaudreuil-sur-le-Lac.
The Village of Saint-Emilien became the Town of Desbiens.
 2 April: The Township of Wolfestown became the Parish of Saint-Julien.
 9 April: 
The Municipality of Saint-Eugène-de-Grantham changed its name to Saint-Eugène.
The Municipality of Sud-Ouest-du-Canton-de-Ham changed its name to Saint-Adrien.
 7 June: The Indian reserve of Lac-John  is created from parts of the Indian reserve of Matimekosh.
 18 June: The Village of Sainte-Germaine-du-Lac-Etchemin chnaged its name to Lac-Etchemin.
 23 July: The United Townships of DeSalaberry-et-Grandison became the Parish of Saint-Jovite.
 30 July: The Municipality of Saint-Faustin-Sud changed its name to Saint-Faustin.
 1 October: The Parish of Orsainville became a Town.

1961 

 1 January: 
Creation of the Village of Saint-Georges-de-Windsor from territories taken from the Township of Saint-Georges-de-Windsor.
Creation of the Village of Saint-Zacharie from territories taken from the Municipality of Saint-Zacharie.
 28 January: The Town of Montréal-Sud is annexed by the City of Longueuil.
 11 February: The Parish of Saint-Martin became the Town of Renaud.
 18 February: 
The Municipality of La Rochelle changed its name to Trois-Lacs.
The Municipality of Partie-Est-du-Canton-d’Ely changed its name to Racine.
The Parish of Sainte-Rose-Est became the Town of Auteuil.
 22 February: The Town of Chicoutimi-Nord became a City.
 24 March:
Creation of the Town of De Grasse from territories taken from the Township of Letellier
The Municipality of Pointe-Claire became the Town of Kirkland.
 1 April: Creation of the City of Chomedey by the merger of the City of Saint-Martin, the Town of L'Abord-à-Plouffe and the Town of Renaud.
 1 May: Creation of the Village of Pointe-des-Cascades from territories taken from the Municipality of Vaudreuil and the Parish of Saint-Joseph-de-Soulanges.
 10 June: 
The Village of Baie-Saint-Paul became a Town. 
The Parish of Saint-Alphonse-de-Liguori changed its name to Saint-Liguori.
 30 June: The Municipality of Massabielle changed its name to Notre-Dame-de-Lourdes-de-Ham.
 12 July: The Village of Shawinigan-Sud became a Town.
 15 July: The Village of Notre-Dame-de-Portneuf became the Town of Portneuf.
 29 July: The Municipality of Royal-Roussillon-de-Macamic became the Parish of Macamic.
 18 November: The Municipality of Partie-Est-du-Canton-de-Stukely-Nord changed its name to Bonsecours.
 25 November: The Township of Ely-Nord became the Municipality of Maricourt.
 9 December: The Village of Amqui became a Town.
 30 December: 
The Municipality of Saint-Michel-des-Forges is annexed by the City of Trois-Rivières.
The Village of Sainte-Anne-de-la-Pocatière became the Town of La Pocatière.
The Township of Doncaster became the Municipality of Sainte-Lucie.

1962 

 1 January: 
The Parish of Saint-Boniface-de-Shawinigan is annexed by the Village of Saint-Boniface-de-Shawinigan.
Creation of the Parish of Saint-Eugène-de-Ladrière from territories taken from the Parish of Saint-Fabien.
 5 January: The Village of Sutton became a Town.
 3 February: The Parish of Saint-Nicolas became a Town.
 10 February: The Parish of Saint-Isidore-de-Lauzon changed its name to Saint-Isidore.
 21 April: The Village of Deux-Rivières changed its name to Saint-Stanislas.
 26 May: 
The Municipality of Bellerive changes its name to Bellerive-sur-le-Lac.
The Municipality of Saint-Dominique-du-Lac changed its name to Saint-Juste-du-Lac. 
The Municipality of Winslow-Nord changed its name to Saint-Romain.
 27 June: The Town of Duvernay became a City.
 30 June: The Parish of Saint-David-de-l'Aube-Rivière became the Town of Saint-David-de-l'Auberivière.
 6 July: 
The Town of Isle-Maligne, the Town of Naudville and the Town of Riverbend are annexed by the City of Alma.
The Town of Laval-des-Rapides became a City.
 21 July: The Township of Ely-Partie-Ouest became the Municipality of Béthanie.
 28 July: The Village of Cabano became a Town.
 1 September: The Township of Farnham-Ouest became the Municipality of Rainville.
 8 September: The Municipality of Beaupré became a Town.
 10 November: The Town of Saint-Léonard-de-Port-Maurice changed its name to Saint-Léonard.
 24 November:
The Town of Saint-Elzéar changed its name to Vimont.
The Village of Saint-Césaire became a Town. 
 22 December: The Village of Ville-Marie became a Town.

1963 

 2 February: The Town of Beauport became a City.
 16 February: The Village of Thurso became a Town.
 30 March: The Village of Saint-Hilaire became the Town of Saint-Hilaire-sur-Richelieu.
 1 April: Creation of the Town of Matagami.
 20 April: The Municipality of Saint-Pamphile became a Town.
 27 April: The Town of Saint-Eustache-sur-le-Lac became the City of Deux-Montagnes.
 4 May: The Township of Boyer became the Municipality of Saguay.
 22 May: The Town of Saint-Léonard became a City.
 1 June: The Municipality of Raudot changed its name to Sainte-Rita.
 22 June: Creation of the Municipality of Côte-Nord-du-Golfe-Saint-Laurent.
 26 June: The Town of Pierrefonds became a City.
 10 July: Creation of the Town of Vaudreuil by the merger of the Municipality of Vaudreuil and the Village of Saint-Michel-de-Vaudreuil.
 13 July: The Town of Rimouski became a City.
 20 July: The Town of Rivière-des-Prairies is annexed by the City of Montréal.
 10 August: The Parish of Trois-Rivières became the Town of Trois-Rivières-Ouest.
 21 September: 
The Parish of Saint-Ambroise changed its name to Neufchâtel.
The Parish of Saint-Philibert-de-Beauce became the Municipality of Saint-Philibert.
 19 October: The Parish of Saint-Luc became a Town.
 9 November: The Township of Farnham-Est became the Municipality of Adamsville.
 23 November: The Parish of Boucherville is annexed by the Town of Boucherville.
 21 December: 
The Town of La Petite-Rivière changed its name to Duberger.
The Municipality of Drummondville-Sud became a Town.
 28 December:
The Village of Rivière-du-Moulin became a Town. 
The Parish of Saint-Romuald-d'Etchemin became a Town.

1964 

 1 January:
Creation of the Municipality of Champneuf.
Creation of the Municipality of Namur from territories taken from the United Townships of Suffolk-et-Addington.
Creation of the Municipality of Saint-Godard-de-Lejeune.
Creation of the Village of Nazareth from territories taken from the Parish of Notre-Dame-du-Sacré-Cœur.
Creation of the Village of Pointe-aux-Outardes and the Village of Pointe-Lebel.
Creation of the Village of Sainte-Agathe-Sud from territories taken from the Parish of Sainte-Agathe.
 1 February: The Village of Sweetsburgh is annexed by the Town of Cowansville.
 21 March: The Parish of Saint-Charles-de-Caplan became the Municipality of Caplan.
 28 March: 
The Municipality of Bout-de-l’Isle is annexed by the Town of Sainte-Anne-de-Bellevue.
The Parish of Notre-Dame-de-Liesse is annexed by the City of Saint-Laurent.
 25 April: The Village of Saraguay is annexed by the City of Montréal.
 9 May: The Parish of Sainte-Victoire changed its name to Saint-Victoire-de-Sorel.
 18 June: 
Creation of the Town of Bromont from territories taken from the Village of Shefford-Ouest, the Township of Brome and the Township of Shefford.
The Town of Laval-Ouest became a City.
 27 June: The Parish of Sainte-Philomène became a Town.
 11 July: The Parish of Neufchâtel became a Town.
 18 July: The Town of Sainte-Rose became a City.
 8 August: The Township of Auckland became the Municipality of Saint-Malo.
 29 August: The Village of Princeville became a Town.
 14 November: The Municipality of Hull changed its name to Lucerne.
 5 December: The Municipality of Havre-Aubert-Est changed its name to Havre-Aubert.

1965 

 1 January: 
Creation of the Municipality of Saint-Elzéar from territories taken from the Municipality of Bonaventure, the Municipality of New Carlisle, the Municipality of Paspébiac-Ouest and other unorganized territories.
Creation of the Municipality of Saint-Jean-de-la-Lande.
Creation of the Village of Île-d’Entrée from territories taken from the Municipality of Havre-Aubert.
The Village of Sainte-Adèle is annexed by the Parish of Sainte-Adèle.
Creation of the Parish of Saint-Alexandre-des-Lacs from territories taken from the Parish of Saint-Benoît-Joseph-Labre, the Parish of Saint-Tharcisius and other unorganized territories.
Creation of the Parish of Saint-Nil and the Parish of Saint-René-de-Matane from territories taken from the dissolution of an unorganized territory formed from territories taken from the Parish of Sainte-Félicité, the former Township of Romieux and the former United Township of Dalibaire-et-Romieu.
Creation of the Parish of Trinité-des-Monts.
 20 February: The Town of Château d’Eau is annexed by the Town of Loretteville.
 13 March: The Parish of Chénéville became the Municipality of Lac-Simon.
 10 April: The Parish of Sainte-Adèle became a Municipality.
 22 May: The Parish of Saint-Gérard-Magella became the Town of Bélair.
 19 June: The Township of Ely changed its name to Valcourt.
 17 July: The Parish of Notre-Dame-des-Laurentides became a Town.
 6 August: 
Creation of the Town of Laval by the merger of the City of Chomedey, the City of Duvernay, the City of Laval-des-Rapides, the City of Laval-Ouest, the City of Pont-Viau, the City of Sainte-Rose, the Town of Auteuil, the Town of Fabreville, the Town of Laval-sur-le-Lac, the Town of Saint-François, the Town of Saint-Vincent-de-Paul, the Town of Sainte-Dorothée, the Town of Ville-des-Iles-Laval and the Town of Vimont.
Creation of the Town of Lebel-sur-Quévillon.
 14 August: The Municipality of Saint-Étienne-de-la-Malbaie is annexed by the Town of La Malbaie.
 18 September: Creation of the City of Chambly by the merger of the Town of Chambly and the Town of Fort-Chambly.
 17 October: Creation of the Town of Bécancour by the merger of the Village of Bécancourt, the Village of Gentilly, the Village of La Rochelle, the Village of Laval, the Village of Villers, the Parish of Bécancour, the Parish of Saint-Edouard-de-Gentilly, the Parish of Saint-Grégoire-le-Grand, the Parish of Sainte-Angèle-de-Laval, the Parish of Sainte-Gertrude and the Parish of Très-Précieux-Sang-de-Notre-Seigneur.
 23 October: The Town of Loretteville became a City.
 30 October: The Village of Saint-Joseph became the Town of Saint-Joseph-de-Beauce.
 13 November: 
The Village of Waterville became a Town.
The Parish of Saint-Jean-Chrysostome became a Town.
 4 December: The Village of Charny became a Town.
 18 December: Creation of the City of Saint-Romuald-d’Etchemin by the merger of the Town of Saint-Romuald-d’Etchemin and the Parish of Saint-Telesphore.
 24 December: The Village of Causapscal became a Town.
 31 December: The Parish of Saint-Joseph-de-Chambly became the Town of Carignan.

1966 

 1 January:
Creation of the Municipality of Baie-Johan-Beetz, The Municipality of Longue-Pointe and the Municipality of Rivière-Saint-Jean.
Creation of the Municipality of Notre-Dame-de-Lorette from territories taken from the Municipality of Saint-Michel-de-Mistassini and other unorganized territories.
Creation of the Parish of Saint-Charles-Garnier.
 29 January: The Municipality of Hull changed its name to Touraine.
 12 March: Creation of the Town of Mont-Saint-Hilaire by the merger of the Town of Saint-Hilaire-sur-Richelieu and the Municipality of Mont-Saint-Hilaire.
 19 March: The Town of Beaconsfield became a City.
 2 April: Creation of the City of Montmagny by the merger of the Town of Montmagny and the Parish of Saint-Thomas.
 23 April: The Municipality of Saint-David-d’Escourt changed its name to Sully.
 30 April: Creation of the City of Lachute by the merger of the Town of Lachute and the Village of Ayersville.
 7 May: The Parish of Saint-Jacques-des-Piles changed its name to Grandes-Piles.
 21 May: The Town of Québec-Ouest changed its name to Ville-Vanier.
 11 June: The Town of Ville-Vanier changed its name to Vanier.
 9 July: The Village of Isletville became the Town of L’Islet.
 20 August: The Village of Shefford-Ouest is annexed by the Town of Bromont.
 24 September: The Village of Masson became a Town.
 12 November: 
The Municipality of Joliette-Sud is annexed by the City of Joliette.
The Village of Drummondville-Ouest is annexed by the City of Drummondville.
 19 November:
The Village of Lac-Etchemin became a Town.
The Village of Saint-Pascal became a Town.
 10 December: The Municipality of Saint-Jérôme became the Parish of Bellefeuille.
 17 December: The Township of Portland changed its name to Notre-Dame-de-la-Salette.
 24 December: The Municipality of Sydenham-Sud changed its name to Saint-Majorique.

1967 

 1 January: Creation of the Municipality of Lamarche from territories taken from the Municipality of Labrecque and other unorganized territories.
 7 January: The Municipality of Beauport-Ouest is annexed by the City of Beauport.
 21 January: The Municipality of Les Écureuils is annexed by the Town of Donnacona.
 1 February: The Village of Grande-Rivière is annexed by the Municipality of Grande-Rivière.
 22 April: The Parish of Saint-Armand-Est changed its name to Frelighsburg.
 27 May: The Parish of Saint-Zotique is annexed by the Village of Saint-Zotique.
 17 June: The Municipality of Saint-Agricole changed its name to Val-des-Lacs.
 30 June:
The Village of Clermont became a Town.
The Village of Épiphanie became the Town of L’Épiphanie.
The Village of Saint-Antoine-des-Laurentides became the Town of Saint-Antoine.
 22 July: The Parish of Sainte-Cécile is annexed by the City of Salaberry-de-Valleyfield.
 29 July: The Village of Notre-Dame-de-Lorette became the Town of Ancienne-Lorette.
 16 September: The Village of Nazareth and the Parish of Notre-Dame-du-Sacré-Cœur are annexed by the City of Rimouski.
 14 October: 
The Municipality of Douville became a Town.
The Village of Saint-Gabriel-de-Brandon became the Town of Saint-Gabriel.
The Parish of Saint-Joseph-de-Mont-Rolland became the Municipality of Mont-Rolland.
The Township of Wexford became the Municipality of Entrelacs.
 21 October: The Village of Soulanges became the Town of Les Cèdres.
 16 December:
The Parish of Saint-Germain-de-Rimouski is annexed by the City of Rimouski.
The Parish of Sainte-Julienne-de-Rawdon changed its name to Sainte-Julienne.
 23 December: The Parish of Sainte-Rose-du-Dégelé changed its name to Sainte-Rose-du-Dégelis.

1968 

 1 January: 
Creation of the Municipality of L’Ascension-de-Patapédia.
Creation of the Municipality of Sainte-Paule.
 3 February: The Town of Sainte-Philomène changed its name to Mercier.
 7 February: The Village of Saint-Joseph became a Town.
 16 March: The Village of Richelieu became a Town.
 20 April: The Municipality of Sainte-Anne-des-Monts became a Town.
 4 May: The Parish of Château-Richer became a Town.
 22 June: The Parish of Saint-Nicolas-Sud became the Municipality of Bernières.
 29 June:
Creation of the Municipality of Saint-Prime by the merger of the Village of Saint-Prime and the Parish of Saint-Prime.
The Parish of Sainte-Thérèse-de-Blainville became the Town of Blainville.
 27 July: The Municipality of Duchesnay changed its name to Rivière-à-Claude.
 31 August: The Township of Gayhurst became the Municipality of Lac-Drolet.
 7 September: The Town of Châteauguay Heights is annexed by the Town of Châteauguay.
 12 October: The Town of Bourlamaque and the Municipality of Lac-Lemoine are annexed by the Town of Val-d'Or.
 19 October: Creation of the Town of Cap-Chat by the merger of the Village of Cap-Chat and the Parish of Saint-Norbert-du-Cap-Chat.
 24 October: The City of Saint-Michel is annexed by the City of Montréal.
 2 November: The Village of Bonsecours changed its name to L’Islet-sur-Mer.
 14 December: Creation of the Town of Notre-Dame-du-Lac by the merger of the Village of Notre-Dame-du-Lac and the Parish of Notre-Dame-du-Lac.

1969 

 15 March: 
The Town of Ville-Les Saules changed its name to Les Saules.
The Town of Ville-Saint-Pierre changed its name to Saint-Pierre.
The Municipality of Anse-aux-Griffons changes its name to L’Anse-aux-Griffons.
The Municipality of Argenteuil became the Parish of Saint-André-d’Argenteuil.
The Municipality of Baie-de-Gaspé-Nord became a Township.
The Municipality of Berthier-en-Haut became the Parish of Sainte-Geneviève-de-Berthier.
The Municipality of Bishopton became a Village.
The Municipality of Chicoutimi became a Township.
The Municipality of Chutes-de-Kingsey changed its name to Kingsey Falls.
The Municipality of Clifton became the Township of Clifton-Partie-Est.
The Municipality of Contrecoeur became a Parish.
The Municipality of Deschambault became the Parish of Saint-Joseph-de-Deschambault.
The Municipality of Dudswell became a Township.
The Municipality of Dundee became a Township.
The Municipality of Eaton became a Township.
The Municipality of Étang-du-Nord changed its name to L’Étang-du-Nord.
The Municipality of Fiedmont-et-Barraute changed its name to Fiedmont.
The Municipality of Gayhurst became the Township of Gayhurst-Partie-Sud-Est.
The Municipality of Godmanchester became a Township.
The Municipality of Grondines became the Parish of Saint-Charles-des-Grondines.
The Municipality of Hatley became the Township of Hatley-Partie-Ouest.
The Municipality of Hull became the Township of Hull-Partie-Ouest.
The Municipality of Inverness became a Township.
The Municipality of Islet became the Parish of Notre-Dame-de-Bon-Secours-de-l’Islet
The Municipality of Kakonna became the Parish of Saint-Georges-de-Cacouna.
The Municipality of L’Annonciation became the Parish of L’Annonciation-Partie-Nord.
The Municipality of La Manaza changed its name to La Macaza.
The Municipality of Lac-Drolet became the Township of Gayhurst.
The Municipality of Lambton became a Township.
The Municipality of Lotbinière became the Parish of Saint-Louis-de-Lotbinière.
The Municipality of Maskinongé became the Parish of Saint-Joseph-de-Maskinongé.
The Municipality of Matane became the Parish of Saint-Jérôme-de-Matane.
The Municipality of Newton became the Parish of Sainte-Justine-de-Newton.
The Municipality of Nouvelle-Longueuil became the Parish of Saint-Polycarpe.
The Municipality of Onslow became the Township of Onslow-Partie-Sud. 
The Municipality of Partie-Est-du-Township-de-Port-Daniel became the Township of Port-Daniel-Partie-Est.
The Municipality of Partie-Ouest-du-Township-de-Port-Daniel became the Township of Port-Daniel-Partie-Ouest.
The Municipality of Partie-Sud-Est-du-Canton-de-Restigouche became the Township of Ristigouche-Partie-Sud-Est.
The Municipality of Pointe-aux-Trembles became a Parish.
The Municipality of Pointe-du-Lac changed its name to La-Visitation-de-la-Pointe-du-Lac.
The Municipality of Port-Joli changed its name to Saint-Jean-Port-Joli.
The Municipality of Rigaud became the Parish of Sainte-Madeleine-de-Rigaud.
The Municipality of Rivière-du-Loup became the Parish of Saint-Patrice-de-la-Rivière-du-Loup.
The Municipality of Rivière-du-Loup-en-Haut became the Parish of Saint-Antoine-de-la-Rivière-du-Loup. 
The Municipality of Saint-Aimé-du-Lac-des-Îles became a Parish.
The Municipality of Saint-Anicet became a Parish.
The Municipality of Saint-Benoît became a Parish.
The Municipality of Saint-Colomban became a Parish.
The Municipality of Saint-Édouard became a Parish.
The Municipality of Saint-Eustache became a Parish.
The Municipality of Saint-Félix-de-Valois became a Parish.
The Municipality of Saint-Féréol became a Parish.
The Municipality of Saint-Hermas became a Parish.
The Municipality of Saint-Janvier-de-la-Croix changed its name to Saint-Janvier-de-Lacroix.
The Municipality of Saint-Pierre-de-la-Rivière-du-Sud became a Parish.
The Municipality of Saint-Simon-de-la-Baie-Ha! Ha! became the Parish of Saint-Simon.
The Municipality of Sainte-Anastasie-de-Nelson became a Parish.
The Municipality of Sainte-Anne-de-la-Pocatière became a Parish.
The Municipality of Sainte-Clothilde-de-Beauce became the Parish of Sainte-Clothilde.
The Municipality of Sainte-Elizabeth became a Parish.
The Municipality of Sainte-Mélanie became a Parish.
The Municipality of Sainte-Scholastique became a Parish.
The Municipality of Sept-Cantons-Unis-de-Saguenay became the United Townships of Les Sept-Cantons-Unis-du-Saguenay.
The Municipality of South-Stukely changed its name to Stukely-Sud.
The Municipality of Stoneham became the United Townships of Stoneham-et-Tewkesbury.
The Municipality of Sud-du-Canton-de-Thetford became the Township of Thetford-Partie-Sud.
The Municipality of Templeton-Est changed its name to Templeton-Est-Partie-Est.
The Municipality of Terrebonne became the Parish of Saint-Louis-de-Terrebonne.
The Municipality of Trois-Pistoles became the Parish of Notre-Dame-des-Neiges-des-Trois-Pistoles.
The Municipality of Varennes became the Parish of Sainte-Anne-de-Varennes.
The Municipality of Verchères became the Parish of Saint-François-Xavier-de-Verchères.
The Municipality of Wakefield became the Township of Wakefield-Partie-Est.
The Municipality of Yamachiche became the Parish of Sainte-Anne-d’Yamachiche.
The Village of Annonciation changed its name to L’Annonciation.
The Village of Avenir changed its name to L'Avenir.
The Village of Baie-de-Shawenegan changed its name to Baie-de-Shawinigan.
The Village of Disraeli became a Town.
The Village of Farnham changed its name to East Farnham.
The Village of Guadeloupe changed its name to La Guadeloupe.
The Village of L'Ange-Gardien changed its name to Ange-Gardien.
The Village of L'Islet-sur-Mer changed its name to Bonsecours.
The Village of Pérade changed its name to La Pérade.
The Village of Saint-Georges-de-Kakouna changed its name to Saint-Georges-de-Cacouna.
The Village of Saint-Ubalde changed its name to Saint-Ubald.
The Village of Station-du-Coteau changed its name to La Station-du-Coteau.
The Village of Wickham-Ouest changed its name to Wickham.
The Parish of Ancienne-Lorette changed its name to L'Ancienne-Lorette.
The Parish of Ange-Gardien changed its name to L'Ange-Gardien.
The Parish of Ange-Gardien changed its name to L'Ange-Gardien.
The Parish of Ascension-de-Notre-Seigneur changed its name to L’Ascension-de-Notre-Seigneur.
The Parish of Batiscan changed its name to Saint-François-Xavier-de-Batiscan.
The Parish of Beaumont changed its name to Saint-Étienne-de-Beaumont.
The Parish of Berthier-en-Bas changed its name to Berthier.
The Parish of Bienheureux-Alphonse-Rodriguez changed its name to Saint-Alphonse-de-Rodriguez.
The Parish of Champlain changed its name to La Visitation-de-Champlain.
The Parish of Des Saints-Anges changed its name to Saints-Anges.
The Parish of Disreali changed its name to Disraeli.
The Parish of Kamouraska changed its name to Saint-Louis-de-Kamouraska.
The Parish of L’Isle-du-Pads changed its name to La Visitation-de-la-Sainte-Vierge-de-l’Isle-du-Pads.
The Parish of Notre-Dame-de-Bonsecours changed its name to Notre-Dame-de-Bon-Secours.
The Parish of Notre-Dame-de-Mont-Carmel changed its name to Notre-Dame-du-Mont-Carmel.
The Parish of Notre-Dame-du-Mont-Carmel became the Municipality of Mont-Carmel.
The Parish of Petite-Rivière changed its name to Saint-François-Xavier-de-la-Petite-Rivière.
The Parish of Pointe-Lévi changed its name to Saint-Joseph-de-la-Pointe-de-Lévy.
The Parish of Sacré-Cœur-de-Marie changed its name to Sacré-Cœur-de-Marie-Partie-Sud.
The Parish of Saint-Alban-d'Alton changed its name to Saint-Alban.
The Parish of Saint-Antoine-Abbé changed its name to Saint-Antoine-Abbé-Partie-Nord-Est.
The Parish of Saint-Antoine-de-la-Valtrie changed its name to Saint-Antoine-de-Lavaltrie.
The Parish of Saint-Antoine-de-Padoue changed its name to Saint-Antoine-de-Padoue-de-Kempt.
The Parish of Saint-Augustin changed its name to Saint-Augustin-de-Desmaures.
The Parish of Saint-Bernard changed its name to Saint-Bernard-Partie-Sud.
The Parish of Saint-Charles-Boromée changed its name to Saint-Charles-Boromé.
The Parish of Saint-Charles-Borrommée-du-Village-d’Industrie changed its name to Saint-Charles-Borromée.
The Parish of Saint-Denis-de-Kamouraska changed its name to Saint-Denis.
The Parish of Saint-Dominique-de-Jonquières changed its name to Saint-Dominique-de-Jonquière.
The Parish of Saint-Éleuthère became a Municipality.
The Parish of Saint-Elzéar-de-Linière became the Municipality of Saint-Elzéar-de-Beauce.
The Parish of Saint-Étienne became the Municipality of Saint-Étienne-de-Beauharnois.
The Parish of Saint-Étienne changed its name to Saint-Étienne-des-Grès.
The Parish of Saint-Eugène-de-l'Islet changed its name to Saint-Eugène.
The Parish of Saint-Frédéric-de-Beauce changed its name to Saint-Frédéric.
The Parish of Saint-Georges became the Municipality of Aubert-Gallion.
The Parish of Saint-Georges-de-Clarenceville became a Municipality.
The Parish of Saint-Gérard-Magella changed its name to Saint-Gérard-Majella.
The Parish of Saint-Germain changed its name to Saint-Germain-de-Grantham.
The Parish of Saint-Gervais-et-Saint-Protais changed its name to Saints-Gervais-et-Protais.
The Parish of Saint-Hémédine changed its name to Sainte-Hénédine.
The Parish of Saint-Henri changed its name to Saint-Henri-de-Lauzon.
The Parish of Saint-Hyacinthe changed its name to Notre-Dame-de-Saint-Hyacinthe.
The Parish of Saint-Isidore-de-Lauzon changed its name to Saint-Isidore.
The Parish of Saint-Jean-Baptiste-de-Rouville changed its name to Saint-Jean-Baptiste.
The Parish of Saint-Joseph changed its name to Saint-Joseph-du-Lac.
The Parish of Saint-Lin-de-Lachenaye changed its name to Saint-Lin.
The Parish of Saint-Louis changed its name to Saint-Louis-de-France.
The Parish of Saint-Mathieu became a Municipality.
The Parish of Saint-Mathieu-de-Dixville became a Municipality.
The Parish of Saint-Michel-Archange became a Municipality.
The Parish of Saint-Nazaire chnaged its name to Saint-Nazaire-de-Dorchester.
The Parish of Saint-Patrice changed its name to Saint-Patrice-de-Sherrington.
The Parish of Saint-Paul changed its name to Saint-Paul d’Abbotsford.
The Parish of Saint-Raphaël changed its name to Saint-Raphaël-Partie-Sud.
The Parish of Saint-Raphaël-de-l’Isle-Bizard changed its name to Saint-Raphaël-de-l’Île-Bizard.
The Parish of Saint-Roch changed its name to Saint-Roch-de-l’Achigan.
The Parish of Saint-Stanislas-de-la-Rivière-des-Envies changed its name to Saint-Stanislas.
The Parish of Saint-Stanislas-Kostka changed its name to Saint-Stanislas-de-Kostka.
The Parish of Saint-Sylvestre-de-Beaurivage changed its name to Saint-Sylvestre.
The Parish of Saint-Tharcisius changed its name to Saint-Tharsicius.
The Parish of Saint-Théophile-de-la-Beauce changed its name to Saint-Théophile-de-Beauce.
The Parish of Saint-Thimothée changed its name to Saint-Timothée.
The Parish of Saint-Thomas-de-Foucault changed its name to Saint-Thomas.
The Parish of Saint-Ubalde changed its name to Saint-Ubald.
The Parish of Saint-Ulric changed its name to Saint-Ulric-de-Matane.
The Parish of Sainte-Angèle changed its name to Sainte-Angèle-de-Monnoir.
The Parish of Sainte-Anne changed its name to Sainte-Anne-de-Sorel.
The Parish of Sainte-Cécile changed its name to Sainte-Cécile-de-Lévrard
The Parish of Sainte-Émélie-de-l’Énergie changed its name to Sainte-Émilie-de-l’Énergie.
The Parish of Sainte-Emmélie-de-Lotbinière changed its name to Sainte-Emmélie.
The Parish of Sainte-Geneviève changed its name to Sainte-Geneviève-de-Batiscan.
The Parish of Sainte-Hedwige changed its name to Sainte-Hedwidge.
The Parish of Sainte-Marthe-du-Cap-de-la-Magdeleine became the Municipality of Sainte-Marthe-du-Cap-de-la-Madeleine.
The Township of Caxton became the Parish of Saint-Élie.
The Township of Ham-Nord became a Municipality.
The Township of Hinchinbrooke changed its name to Hinchinbrook.
The Township of Ireland-Nord changed its name to Ireland-Partie-Nord.
The Township of Ireland-Sud became the Municipality of Ireland.
The Township of Lochaber changed its name to Lochaber-Partie-Nord.
The Township of Lochaber changed its name to Lochaber-Partie-Ouest.
The Township of Masham changed its name to Masham-Nord.
The Township of Matapédia became the Parish of Saint-Alexis-de-Matapédia.
The Township of Partie-Est-du-Township-de-Leeds changed its name to Leeds-Partie-Est.
The Township of Stanfold became the Parish of Saint-Eusèbe-de-Stanfold.
The United Townships of Risborough-et-Marlow changed its name to Risborough-et-Partie-de-Marlow.
 26 April: The Municipality of Otterburn Park became a Town.
 3 May: The Town of Préville is annexed by the City of Saint-Lambert.
 7 June:
Creation of the Town of Hudson by the merger of the Village of Como-Est, the Village of Hudson and the Village of Hudson Heights.
The Parish of Notre-Dame-des-Anges-de-Montauban is annexed by the Village of Notre-Dame-des-Anges.
The Parish of Saint-Basile-le-Grand became a Town.
 5 July: The Village of La Providence became a Town.
 19 July: 
Creation of the Municipality of Saint-Dominique by the merger of the Village of Saint-Dominique and the Parish of Saint-Dominique.
The Parish of Saint-Mathias-de-Cabano is annexed by the Town of Cabano.
 16 August: 
The City of Jacques-Cartier is annexed by the City of Longueuil.
The Parish of Saint-Eusèbe-de-Stanfold changed its name to Princeville.
 11 October: The Village of Charlemagne became a Town.
 22 November: The Parish of Saint-Féréol became the Municipality of Saint-Féréol-des-Neiges.
 29 November: Creation of the Village of Saint-André-du-Lac-Saint-Jean by the merger of the Municipality of Saint-André and the Village of Saint-André.
 13 December:
The Parish of Sainte-Rose-du-Dégelis became the Town of Dégelis.
The Township of New Richmond became a Town.

1970

 1 January: 
The Town of Les Saules is annexed by Quebec City.
Creation of the Communauté urbaine de Québec
 24 January: The Parish of Sainte-Jeanne-d’Arc is annexed by the Village of Sainte-Jeanne-d’Arc.
 14 March: The Township of Mann became the Municipality of Pointe-à-la-Croix.
 28 March: The Parish of Sainte-Flore is annexed by the City of Grand-Mère.
 25 April: The Parish of Saint-Jean-l’Évangéliste is annexed by the City of Saint-Jean.
 25 July: The Municipality of Saint-Thérèse-Ouest became a Town.
 1 August: The Town of Duberger is annexed by Quebec City.
 15 August: The Village of Saint-Jean-Eudes is annexed by the City of Arvida.
 26 December: The Parish of L’Ancienne-Lorette is annexed by the City of Sainte-Foy.

1971 

 1 January: 
Creation of the City of Percé by the merger of the Municipality of Barachois, the Municipality of Bridgeville, the Municipality of Cap-d’Espoir, the Municipality of Percé and the Parish of Saint-Pierre-de-la-Malbaie-Numéro-Deux.
Creation of the City of Sainte-Scholastique by the merger of the Municipality of Saint-Janvier-de-Lacroix, the Village of Saint-Augustin, the Village of Saint-Benoît, the Village of Sainte-Scholastique, the Parish of Saint-Antoine-des-Laurentides, the Parish of Saint-Augustin, the Parish of Saint-Canut, the Parish of Saint-Hermas, the Parish of Saint-Janvier-de-Blainville, the Parish of Sainte-Monique, the Parish of Sainte-Scholastique and territories taken from the Town of Sainte-Thérèse-Ouest.
The Town of Neufchâtel is annexed by Quebec City.
The Municipality of Baie-de-Gaspé-Sud, the Municipality of Grande-Grève, the Municipality of Haldimand, the Municipality of L’Anse-aux-Griffons, the Municipality of Rivière-au-Renard, the Municipality of Saint-Alban-du-Cap-des-Rosiers, the Municipality of Saint-Majorique, the Municipality of York, the Parish of Saint-Maurice, the Township of Baie-de-Gaspé-Nord and the Township of Douglas are annexed by the Town of Gaspé.
The Village of Val-Jalbert is annexed by the Parish of Saint-Louis-de-Chambord.
The Parish of Saint-Jérusalem-d’Argenteuil is dissolved and its territory is split between the City of Lachute and the newly formed City of Sainte-Scholastique.
 2 January: Creation of the City of Lac-Brome by the merger of the Village of Foster, the Village of Knowlton and the Township of Brome.
 9 January: The Parish of Saint-Henri-de-Mascouche became the City of Mascouche.
 13 February: The Municipality of Saint-Jean-de-Dieu became a Parish.
 6 March: The Municipality of Christie changed its name to La Martre.
 29 May: The Municipality of Brunet is annexed by the Town of Mont-Laurier.
 14 July: Creation of the Municipality of Baie-James.
 28 August: 
The Municipality of Ascot-Nord changed its name to Fleurimont.
The Parish of Berthier changed its name to Berthier-sur-Mer.
 18 September: Creation of the Municipality of Verchères by the merger of the Village of Verchères and the Parish of Saint-François-Xavier-de-Verchères.
 25 September:
Creation of the City of Dunham by the merger of the Village of Dunham and the Township of Dunham.
Creation of the Municipality of Lac-Bouchette by the merger of the Village of Lac-Bouchette and the Municipality of Saint-Thomas-d’Aquin. 
The Municipality of Saint-Ambroise is annexed by the Village of Saint-Ambroise.
 23 October: The Municipality of Touraine became a City.
 30 October: 
The City of Laflèche is annexed by the Town of Saint-Hubert.
Creation of the Municipality of Lac-Nominingue by the merger of the Municipality of Bellerive-sur-le-Lac, the Village of Nominingue and the Township of Loranger.
The Parish of Sainte-Julie became the City of Saint-Julie.
 18 December: Creation of the Municipality of Île-du-Havre-Aubert by the merger of the Municipality of Bassin and the Municipality of Havre-Aubert.

1972 

 15 January: The Parish of Saint-Eustache is annexed by the Town of Saint-Eustache.
 29 January: The Parish of Sainte-Cécile-du-Bic is annexed by the Village of Bic.
 13 May: 
Creation of the Municipality of Esprit-Saint.
Creation of the Municipality of Sullivan.
 24 August:
The City of Saint-Julie changed its name to Sainte-Julie.
The Municipality of Saint-Féréol-des-Neiges changed its name to Saint-Féréol-les-Neiges.
The Village of Bonsecours changed its name to L'Islet-sur-Mer.
The Township of Gayhurst became the Municipality of Lac-Drolet.
 26 August: 
Creation of the City of Carleton by the merger of the Municipality of Carleton-sur-Mer and the Township of Carleton.
Creation of the City of Varennes by the merger of the Village of Varennes and the Parish of Sainte-Anne-de-Varennes.
 2 September: 
Creation of the Municipality of Boucher.
Creation of the Municipality of Gallix.
Creation of the Municipality of Haute-Mauricie.
 30 September: Creation of the Municipality of Rivière-Pentecôte.
 25 November: The Parish of Saint-Benoît-Abbé changed its name to Packington.
 16 December: The Village of Notre-Dame-d’Hébertville is annexed by the Municipality of Hébertville.
 23 December:
The Village of Wickham is annexed by the Municipality of Wickham.
The Parish of Saint-Charles-de-Lachenaie became the City of Lachenaie.

1973 

 1 January: Creation of the Municipality of Saint-Honoré by the merger of the Village of Saint-Honoré and the Parish of Saint-Honoré.
 20 January: Creation of the Municipality of Shawbridge by the merger of the Municipality of Lesage, Village of Prévost and the Village of Shawbridge.
 27 January:
Creation of the City of Sainte-Anne-de-Beaupré by the merger of the Village of Sainte-Anne-de-Beaupré and the Parish of Sainte-Anne-de-Beaupré.
The City of Sainte-Scholastique changed its name to Mirabel.
Creation of the Municipality of Labelle by the merger of the Village of Labelle and the Township of Joly.
 3 March:
Creation of the Municipality of Franklin by the merger of the Parish of Saint-Antoine-Abbé-Partie-Nord-Est and the Township of Franklin.
Creation of the Municipality of Saint-Ubalde by the merger of the Village of Saint-Ubald and the Parish of Saint-Ubald.
 14 March: The Town of Beauceville-Est is annexed by the Town of Beauceville.
 1 May: The Municipality of Charlesbourg-Ouest is annexed by Quebec City.
 5 May: The Municipality of Sainte-Adèle became a City.
 12 May: 
Creation of the Municipality of Saint-Fulgence by the merger of the Village of Saint-Fulgence and the Parish of Saint-Fulgence.
The Parish of Saint-Constant became a City.
 30 June: Creation of the Municipality of Sacré-Coeur by the merger of the Municipality of Sacré-Coeur-de-Jésus-Village and the Parish of Sacré-Coeur-de-Jésus.
 21 July: The Municipality of Winslow-Sud changed its name to Stornoway.
 4 August: The Parish of Sainte-Catherine-d’Alexandrie-de-Laprairie became the City of Sainte-Catherine.
 15 September: The Municipality of Sainte-Marthe-sur-le-Lac became a City.
 3 November: Creation of the City of Pohénégamook by the merger of the Municipality of Saint-Éleuthère, the Municipality of Sully and the Parish of Saint-Pierre-d’Estcourt.
 13 November: Creation of the Municipality of Belleau.
 17 November: The Parish of Saint-Laurent-de-Matapédia changed its name to Matapédia.
 24 November: Creation of the Municipality of Rivière-Pigou.
 1 December: The Parish of Saint-Paul-l’Ermite became a City.
 8 December: Creation of the Municipality of Chambord by the merger of the Village of Chambord and the Parish of Saint-Louis-de-Chambord.
 29 December: Creation of the City of Val-Bélair by the merger of the Town of Bélair and the Town of Val-Saint-Michel.

1974 

 9 February: The Municipality of Amos-Ouest is annexed by the Town of Amos.
 5 March: 
The Town of Sainte-Thérèse-Ouest changed its name to Boisbriand.
The Parish of Saint-Tharsicius changed its name to Saint-Tharcisius.
 6 April: Creation of the Municipality of Saint-Apollinaire by the merger of the Village of Francoeur and the Parish of Saint-Apollinaire.
 13 April: The Village of Valcourt became a City.
 22 June: The Parish of Saint-Nil became a Municipality.
 20 July: Creation of the Municipality of Rivière-Éternité.
 31 August: Creation of the Municipality of Saint-Clet by the merger of the Village of Saint-Clet and the Parish of Saint-Clet.
 7 September: The Parish of Sainte-Théodosie-Calixa-Lavallée changed its name to Calixa-Lavallée.
 21 September: Creation of the City of Grande-Rivière by the merger of the Municipality of Grande-Rivière, the Municipality of Grande-Rivière-Ouest and the Municipality of Petit-Pabos.
 28 September: The Village of Fossambault-sur-le-Lac became a City.
 12 October: The Township of Leeds-Partie-Est is annexed by the Municipality of Saint-Pierre-de-Broughton.
 15 October: Creation of the Town of Fermont.

1975 

 1 January: 
The City of Arvida, the City of Kénogami and the Parish of Saint-Dominique-de-Jonquière are annexed by the City of Jonquière.
Creation of the City of Lucerne by the merger of the Town of Aylmer, the Municipality of Lucerne and the Village of Deschênes.
The Town of Masson, the Village of Angers, the Parish of L'Ange-Gardien, the Township of Buckingham and the Township of Notre-Dame-de-la-Salette are annexed by the Town of Buckingham.
The City of Touraine, The Town of Pointe-Gatineau, The Municipality of Templeton-Est, The Municipality of Templeton-Est-Patie-Est, The Municipality of Templeton-Ouest and the Village of Templeton are annexed by the Town of Gatineau.
Creation of the Municipality of La Pêche by the merger of the Municipality of Sainte-Cécile-de-Masham, the Village of Wakefield, the Township of Aldfield, the Township of Masham-Nord and the Township of Wakefield.
Creation of the Municipality of Pontiac by the merger of the Village of Quyon, the Township of Eardley, the Township of Onslow and the Township of Onslow-Partie-Sud.
Creation of the Municipality of Val-des-Monts by the merger of the Municipality of Perkins, the Municipality of Portland-Ouest and the Township of Wakefield-Partie-Est.
 15 March: Creation of the Municipality of Saint-Sébastien by the merger of the Village of Saint-Sébastien and the Parish of Saint-Sébastien.
 29 March: The Township of Hincks became the Municipality of Lac-Sainte-Marie.
 5 April: The United Townships of Robertson-et-Pope became the Municipality of Des Ruisseaux.
 14 June: Creation of the Municipality of Rivière-Bleue by the merger of the Village of Saint-Joseph-de-la-Rivière-Bleue and the Parish of Saint-Joseph-de-la-Rivière-Bleue.
 21 June: Creation of the City of Métabetchouan by the merger of the Village of Saint-Jérôme and the Parish of Saint-Jérôme.
 28 June: Creation of the Municipality of Saint-Théophile by the merger of the Village of Saint-Théophile and the Parish of Saint-Théophile-de-Beauce.
 12 July: The Village of Saint-Bruno is annexed by the Municipality of Saint-Bruno.
 2 August: Creation of the Municipality of Lacorne.
 13 September: The Municipality of Sainte-Lucie changed its name to Sainte-Lucie-des-Laurentides.
 20 September: The Parish of Saint-Rémi is annexed by the Town of Saint-Rémi.
 1 November: 
Creation of the Municipality of Saint-Henri by the merger of the Village of Saint-Henri and the Parish of Saint-Henri-de-Lauzon.
The Village of Durham-Sud is annexed by the Municipality of Durham-Sud.
 3 November: The Town of Châteauguay-Centre is annexed by the Town of Châteauguay.
 6 December: Creation of the Municipality of Saint-Gédéon by the merger of the Village of Saint-Gédéon and the Parish of Saint-Gédéon.
 19 December: The Town of Saguenay is annexed by the Township of Chicoutimi.

1976 

 1 January: 
The City of Chicoutimi-Nord, the Town of Rivière-du-Moulin and the Township of Chicoutimi are annexed by the City of Chicoutimi.
The City of Giffard, the Town of Courville, the Town of Montmorency, the Town of Villeneuve, the Municipality of Saint-Michel-Archange and the Municipality of Sainte-Thérèse-de-Lisieux are annexed by the City of Beauport.
Creation of the City of La Baie by the merger of the Town of Bagotville, the Town of Port-Alfred, the Municipality of Grande-Baie and the Parish of Bagotville.
The Town of Douville, the Town of La Providence and the Town of Saint-Joseph are annexed by the City of Saint-Hyacinthe.
The Town of Notre-Dame-des-Laurentides, the Town of Orsainville and the Municipality of Charlesbourg-Est are annexed by the City of Charlesbourg.
Creation of the Municipality of Contrecoeur by the merger of the Village of Contrecoeur and the Parish of Contrecoeur.
Creation of the Municipality of Lac-à-la-Croix by the merger of the Village of Lac-à-la-Croix and the Parish of Sainte-Croix.
The Municipality of Saint-Joseph-d’Alma is annexed by the City of Alma.
 3 January:
Creation of the Municipality of Notre-Dame-de-Montauban by the merger of the Village of Montauban and the Village of Notre-Dame-des-Anges.
The Municipality of Saint-Michel-de-Mistassini is annexed by the Town of Mistassini.
 17 April: 
The City of Lucerne changed its name to Aylmer.
Creation of the Municipality of Saint-Stanislas by the merger of the Village of Saint-Stanislas and the Parish of Saint-Stanislas.
 8 May: The Parish of Saint-Thomas became the Municipality of Noyan.
 5 June: The Township of Aylwin became the Municipality of Kazabazua.
 18 September: 
Creation of the Municipality of Lyster by the merger of the Village of Lyster and the Parish of Sainte-Anastasie-de-Nelson.
Creation of the Municipality of Saint-Sylvère by the merger of the Village of Saint-Sylvère and the Parish of Saint-Sylvère.
 9 October: The Municipality of Rivière-Boyer is annexed by the Municipality of Saint-Henri.
 4 December: The Municipality of Lacadie changed its name to L'Acadie.
 23 December:
Creation of the Municipality of Lambton by the merger of the Village of Lambton and the Township of Lambton.
The Municipality of Roberval is annexed by the City of Roberval.
The Municipality of Saint-Félicien is annexed by the Town of Saint-Félicien.
Creation of the Municipality of Sainte-Marie-de-Blandford by the merger of the Village of Sainte-Marie and the Parish of Sainte-Marie-de-Blandford.
The Village of L'Avenir is annexed by the Municipality of L'Avenir.
 30 December: Creation of the Municipality of Sainte-Anne-du-Lac by the merger of the Village of Sainte-Anne-du-Lac and the Township of Décarie.

1977 

 15 January: The Township of Maria became a Municipality.
 4 June: Creation of the Municipality of Saint-Pierre-de-Lamy.
 9 July:
Creation of the Municipality of Sainte-Hélène-de-Bagot by the merger of the Village of Sainte-Hélène-de-Bagot and the Parish of Sainte-Hélène.
The Village of Saint-Jean-Vianney is annexed by the Municipality of Shipshaw.
The Parish of L’Annonciation-Partie-Nord changed its name to Oka.
 8 August: The United Townships of Masson-et-Laviolette became a Municipality.
 20 August: The Township of Bégin became a Municipality.
 1 October: Creation of the Municipality of Sainte-Claire by the merger of the Municipality of Louis-Joliette and the Parish of Sainte-Claire.
 15 October: The Municipality of Shawbridge changed its name to Prévost.

1978 

 1 January: 
Creation of the Municipality of Ferland-et-Boilleau.
Creation of the Municipality of Franquelin from territories taken from the United Townships of Les Sept-Cantons-Unis-du-Saguenay.
The Municipality of Lacorne changed its name to La Corne.
Creation of the Municipality of Saint-Dominique-du-Rosaire.
Creation of the Municipality of Saint-Guillaume-de-Granada, the Municipality of Saint-Joseph-de-Cléricy and the Municipality of Saint-Norbert-de-Mont-Brun.
 7 January: The Village of Saint-Grégoire changed its name to Mont-Saint-Grégoire.
 11 February:
Creation of the Municipality of Fiedmont-et-Barraute by the merger of the Town of Barville and the Municipality of Fiedmont.
The Municipality of La-Visitation-de-la-Pointe-du-Lac is annexed by the Municipality of Pointe-du-Lac.
 13 May: The Municipality of Saint-Féréol-les-Neiges changed its name to Saint-Ferréol-les-Neiges.
 25 March: The Municipality of Notre-Dame is annexed by the Town of Brossard.
 1 April: The Parish of Sainte-Claire-d’Assise changed its name to Rivière-Beaudette.
 15 April: The Parish of Sainte-Marie is annexed by the Town of Sainte-Marie.
 27 May: The City of Saint-Paul-l’Ermite changed its name to Le Gardeur.
 28 June: 
Creation of the Cree Village of Eastmain, the Cree Village of Fort-George, the Cree Village of Fort-Rupert, the Cree Village of Mistassini, the Cree Village of Nemiscau, the Cree Village of Nouveau-Comptoir and the Cree Village of Waswanipi from territories taken from the Municipality of Baie-James.
Creation of the Cree Village of Poste-de-la-Baleine.
 15 July: The Township of Emberton became the Municipality of Chartierville.
 9 September: The Parish of Saint-Maxime became the Municipality of Scott.
 11 November: 
The City of Saint-Jean changed its name to Saint-Jean-sur-Richelieu.
The Parish of Notre-Dame-de-la-Providence changed its name to Notre-Dame-des-Pins.

1979 

 1 January: 
Creation of the Municipality of Beaudry, the Municipality of Bellecombe, the Municipality of Cloutier, the Municipality of Kinojévis, the Municipality of Rollet and the Municipality of Vassan.
Creation of the Municipality of Lotbinière by the merger of the Village of Lotbinière and the Parish of Saint-Louis-de-Lotbinière.
Creation of the Municipality of Preissac.
 3 March: Creation of the Municipality of Saint-Michel-des-Saints by the merger of the Municipality of Masson-et-Laviolette and the Parish of Saint-Michel-des-Saints.
 10 March: Creation of the City of Normandin by the merger of the Village of Normandin and the Township of Normandin.
 14 April: Creation of the Municipality of Saint-Agapit by the merger of the Village of Saint-Agapitville and the Parish of Saint-Agapit-de-Beaurivage
 23 June: The Township of Dumas became the Municipality of Petit-Saguenay.
 30 June: The Township of Lochaber-Partie-Nord became the Municipality of Saint-Sixte.
 25 August: Creation of the Municipality of Delisle by the merger of the Village of Saint-Cœur-de-Marie and the Township of Delisle.
 29 December: Creation of the Northern Village of Kuujjuaq.

1980 

 1 January: 
Creation of the City of Masson, the Municipality of Ange-Gardien and the Municipality of Notre-Dame-de-la-Salette from territories taken from the Town of Buckingham.
Creation of the Municipality of Arntfield, the Municipality of D’Alenbert and the Municipality of Montbeillard.
Creation of the Municipality of Sainte-Gertrude-Manneville.
The Village of Pascalis became the Municipality of Val-Senneville.
 5 January: 
The Municipality of Saint-Luc-de-Laval is annexed by the Town of Forestville.
Creation of the Municipality of Saint-Pacôme by the merger of the Village of Saint-Pacôme and the Parish of Saint-Pacôme.
 16 February: The Parish of Saint-Marc changed its name to Saint-Marc-sur-Richelieu.
 22 March: Creation of the Municipality of Bouchette by the merger of the Township of Bouchette and the Township of Cameron.
 12 April: The Township of Privat became the Village of Taschereau.
 19 April: The Township of La Sarre is annexed by the Town of La Sarre.
 27 September: The Village of Bois-des-Filion became a City.
 27 December: Creation of the Municipality of Sainte-Marthe by the merger of the Village of Sainte-Marthe and the Parish of Sainte-Marthe.

1981 

 1 January:
Creation of the Municipality of Destor and the Municipality of Lac-Dufault.
Creation of the Municipality of Rapide-Danseur.
The Parish of Saint-Jean-de-Dieu is annexed by the City of Montréal.
 3 January: The Municipality of Adamsville changed its name to Brigham.
 28 February:
The Municipality of Kinojévis changed its name to McWatters.
The Parish of Saint-Théophile became the Municipality of Lac-à-la-Tortue.
 4 April: The Township of Bourget changed its name to Saint-Charles-de-Bourget.
 27 June: The Municipality of Sud-Ouest-du-Canton-d’Halifax-Sud changed its name to Vianney.
 15 July: The Village of Saint-Rédempteur became a City.
 25 July: Creation of the Municipality of Saint-Casimir by the merger of the Village of Saint-Casimir and the Village of Saint-Casimir-Est.
 8 August: The Parish of Saint-Barthélemi changed its name to Saint-Barthélemy.
 5 September: The Township of Saint-Jean became the Municipality of L'Anse-Saint-Jean.
 19 September: The Village of La Reine is annexed by the Municipality of La Reine.
 10 October: The Parish of La Visitation-de-la-Sainte-Vierge-de-l’Isle-du-Pads became the Municipality of La Visitation-de-l'Île-Dupas.
 17 October: The Township of Saint-Charles-de-Bourget became a Municipality.
 21 November: Creation of the Village of Mont-Rolland by the merger of the City of Mont-Gabriel and the Municipality of Mont-Rolland.
 12 December: 
The Parish of Saint-Antoine-de-Padoue-de-Kempt became the Municipality of Padoue.
Creation of the Parish of Tingwick by the merger of the Municipality of Chénier and the Municipality of Tingwick.
 26 December: The City of Drummondville-Sud is annexed by the City of Drummondville.

1982 

 1 January: 
Creation of the Municipality of Dubuisson.
Creation of the Municipality of Rivière-Héva.
 6 February: Creation of the Municipality of Coteau-du-Lac by the merger of the Village of Coteau-du-Lac and the Parish of Saint-Ignace-du-Coteau-du-Lac.
 24 April: The Municipality of Petite-Matane changed its name to Petit-Matane.
 17 July: The City of Pointe-aux-Trembles is annexed by the City of Montréal.
 12 August: The City of Oka-sur-le-Lac is annexed by the Parish of Oka.
 11 September: The Township of Ireland-Partie-Nord became the Municipality of Saint-Adrien-d’Irlande.
 18 September: The City of Saint-Romuald-d’Etchemin changed its name to Saint-Romuald.
 16 October: The Village of Saint-Cyrille became the Municipality of Saint-Cyrille-de-Wendover.
 30 October: The Township of Leeds became the Municipality of Kinnear’s Mills.
 6 November: 
Creation of the Municipality of Saint-Hugues by the merger of the Village of Saint-Hugues and the Parish of Saint-Hugues.
The Parish of Saint-Antoine-de-Padoue is annexed by the Municipality of Saint-Antoine-sur-Richelieu.
 27 November: The Parish of Saint-Paulin-Dalibaire and the Parish of Saint-Thomas-de-Cherbourg are annexed by the Municipality of Les Méchins.
 11 December: Creation of the Municipality of Champlain by the merger of the Village of Champlain and the Parish of La Visitation-de-Champlain.
 18 December: 
Creation of the Municipality of Chesterville by the merger of the Village of Chesterville and the Township of Chester-Ouest.
Creation of the Municipality of Saint-René-de-Matane by the merger of the Municipality of Saint-Nil and the Parish of Saint-René-de-Matane.
 24 December: Creation of the Municipality of Sayabec by the merger of the Village of Sayabec and the Parish of Sainte-Marie-de-Sayabec.

1983 

 1 January: 
The City of Hauterive is annexed by the City of Baie-Comeau.
Creation of the Municipality of Authier-Nord from territories taken from the Parish of Macamic and other unorganized territories.
Creation of the Municipality of La Morandière and the Municipality of Rochebaucourt.
 28 May: The Parish of Saint-Félix-du-Cap-Rouge became the City of Cap-Rouge.
 4 June: The Municipality of Rock-Forest became a City.
 20 August: The Township of Otis became the Municipality of Saint-Félix-d’Otis.
 3 September: The Parish of Notre-Dame-de-la-Doré changed its name to La Doré.
 10 September: The Parish of Saint-Timothée changed its name to Hérouxville.
 17 September: The Parish of Saint-Rémi changed its name to Lac-aux-Sables.
 29 October: Creation of the City of Moisie by the merger of the Municipality of Moisie and the Municipality of Rivière-Pigou.
 31 December: Creation of the Municipality of Laterrière by the merger of the Village of Laterrière and the Parish of Notre-Dame-de-Laterrière.

1984 

 18 February: The Parish of Sainte-Clothilde changed its name to Sainte-Clothilde-de-Châteauguay.
 10 March: The Parish of Sainte-Clothilde-de-Châteauguay changed its name to Sainte-Clotilde-de-Châteauguay.
 17 March: The Municipality of Lac-des-Écorces changed its name to Beaux-Rivages.
 14 April:
The Town of Pointe-du-Moulin is annexed by the Parish of Notre-Dame-de-l’Île-Perrot. 
The Parish of Saint-Amable became a Municipality.
 21 April:
Creation of the Municipality of Grondines by the merger of the Village of Saint-Charles-des-Grondines and the Parish of Saint-Charles-des-Grondines.
Creation of the Parish of Saint-Alexis-des-Monts by the merger of the Municipality of Belleau and the Parish of Saint-Alexis.
 21 July: 
The Municipality of Saint-Étienne changed its name to Saint-Étienne-de-Lauzon.
The Municipality of Saint-Firmin changed its name to Baie-Sainte-Catherine.
The Village of La Station-du-Coteau changed its name to Coteau-Station.
 8 September: The City of De Grasse is annexed by the City of Moisie.
 29 September: 
Creation of the Municipality of Saint-Patrice-de-Beaurivage by the merger of the Village of Saint-Patrice-de-Beaurivage and the Parish of Saint-Patrice-de-Beaurivage.
The Parish of Sainte-Catherine became the Municipality of Sainte-Catherine-de-la-Jacques-Cartier.
The Township of Turgeon became the Village of Sainte-Véronique.
 20 October: The Parish of Sainte-Clothilde became the Municipality of Sainte-Clotilde-de-Beauce.
 15 December: The Parish of Saint-Joachim-de-Tourelle became the Municipality of Tourelle.

1985 

 19 January: The Township of Nelson is annexed by the Parish of Sainte-Agathe.
 9 February: The Village of Saint-Ambroise became a Municipality.
 16 February: 
The Village of Sainte-Pudentienne changed its name to Roxton-Pond.
The Parish of Saint-François-de-Sales-de-la-Rivière-du-Sud became the Municipality of Saint-François-de-la-Rivière-du-Sud.
 23 February: The Parish of Sainte-Pudentienne changed its name to Roxton-Pond.
 9 March: Creation of the Municipality of Les Cèdres by the merger of the City of Les Cèdres and the Parish of Saint-Joseph-de-Soulanges.
 8 June: The Parish of Saint-Louis-de-Terrebonne is annexed by the City of Terrebonne.
 3 July: The Parish of Saint-Gabriel became a Municipality.
 28 September: Creation of the Municipality of Frelighsburg by the merger of the Village of Frelighsburg and the Parish of Frelighsburg.
 5 October: The Municipality of Saint-Gabriel-Ouest is annexed by the Municipality of Saint-Gabriel-de-Valcartier.
 12 October: The Village of Saint-Herménégilde is annexed by the Municipality of Saint-Herménégilde.

1986 

 15 February:
The Municipality of Saint-Laurent changed its name to Gallichan.
The Township of Kénogami became the Municipality of Lac-Kénogami.
 22 February: Creation of the Municipality of Saint-Pierre-les-Becquets by the merger of the Village of Les Becquets and the Parish of Saint-Pierre-les-Becquets,
 29 March: The Parish of Saint-François-Xavier-de-Batiscan became the Municipality of Batiscan.
 12 Apri: The Parish of Saint-François-Xavier-de-la-Petite-Rivière became the Municipality of Petite-Rivière-Saint-François.
 10 May: The Municipality of Messine changed its name to Messines.
 17 May: The Township of Montminy became the Municipality of Saint-Paul-de-Montminy.
 21 June: 
The Parish of Saint-Charles-Borromée became a Municipality.
The Township of Hereford became the Municipality of East Hereford.
 5 July: Creation of the City of Rouyn-Noranda by the merger of the City of Noranda and the City of Rouyn.
 19 July:
The Parish of Saint-Jacques-de-Parisville changed its name to Parisville.
The Parish of Sainte-Hedwidge became a Municipality.
The Township of Woodbridge became the Municipality of Saint-Bruno-de-Kamouraska.
 30 August: 
The Municipality of Lac-à-la-Tortue became a Parish.
The Municipality of Saguay became the Village of Lac-Saguay.
 18 October: The Parish of Saint-Louis-de-Pintendre became the Municipality of Pintendre.
 20 December: 
Creation of the Municipality of Val-Brillant by the merger of the Village of Val-Brillant and the Parish of Saint-Pierre-du-Lac.
The Village of Saint-Jovite became a City.

1987 

 1 January: Creation of the Municipality of La Bostonnais.
 17 January:
The Municipality of Amos-Est is annexed by the City of Amos.
The Parish of Sainte-Elizabeth changed its name to Sainte-Élisabeth.
 7 February: 
The Parish of Saint-Antoine-de-la-Rivière-du-Loup became a Municipality.
The Parish of Saint-Antoine-de-Pontbriand became the Municipality of Pontbriand.
 11 February: Creation of the Municipality of Saint-André by the merger of the Village of Andréville and the Parish of Saint-André.
 1 April: Creation of the Municipality of Kamouraska by the merger of the Village of Kamouraska and the Parish of Saint-Louis-de-Kamouraska.
 11 April: The Municipality of Ireland changed its name to Irlande.
 9 May: Creation of the Municipality of Saint-Bernard by the merger of the Village of Saint-Bernard and the Parish of Saint-Bernard.
 18 July: 
The City of Ancienne-Lorette changed its name to L'Ancienne-Lorette.
The City of Île-Cadieux changed its name to L'Île-Cadieux.
The City of Île-Dorval changed its name to L'Île-Dorval.
The City of Île-Perrot changed its name to L'Île-Perrot.
The Municipality of Ange-Gardien changed its name to L'Ange-Gardien.
The Municipality of Escoumins changed its name to Les Escoumins.
The Municipality of Île-du-Havre-Aubert changed its name to L’Île-du-Havre-Aubert.
The Village of Ange-Gardien changed its name to L'Ange-Gardien.
The Village of Bic became the Municipality of Le Bic.
The Village of Île-d’Entrée changed its name to L’Île-d’Entrée.
The Parish of Saint-Charles-Boromé changed its name to Saint-Charles-Borromée.
The Parish of Sainte-Anne-des-Plaines became a City.
The Parish of Trinité-des-Monts changed its name to La Trinité-des-Monts.
The Cree Village of Fort-George changed its name to Chisasibi.
The Cree Village of Nouveau-Comptoir changed its name to Wemindji.
 31 October: The Parish of Saint-Cyprien changed its name to Saint-Cyprien-de-Napierville.
 26 December: Creation of the Municipality of Yamachiche by the merger of the Village of Yamachiche and the Parish of Sainte-Anne-d’Yamachiche.

1988 

 20 February: 
The Township of Taché became the Municipality of Saint-Nazaire.
The United Townships of Wendover-et-Simpson became the Municipality of Saint-Charles-de-Drummond.
 27 February: Creation of the Municipality of Saint-Paulin by the merger of the Village of Saint-Paulin, the Parish of Saint-Paulin and the Township of Hunterstown.
 30 April: The Parish of Sainte-Angèle became the Municipality of Sainte-Angèle-de-Prémont.
 21 May: The Parish of Grandes-Piles became a Village.
 10 September: The Parish of Sainte-Brigitte-de-Laval became a Municipality.
 17 September: Creation of the Municipality of Saint-Alexandre by the merger of the Village of Saint-Alexandre and the Parish of Saint-Alexandre.
 29 October:
The Parish of Saint-Jean-Baptiste-Vianney became the Municipality of Saint-Vianney.
The Parish of Saint-Mathias changed its name to Saint-Mathias-sur-Richelieu.
 2 November: The Parish of Sainte-Anne-de-la-Pointe-au-Père became the Municipality of Pointe-au-Père.
 3 December: The Township of Dorion became the Municipality of Cayamant.
 31 December: 
The Municipality of Saint-Antoine-de-la-Rivière-du-Loup is annexed by the City of Louiseville.
Creation of the Municipality of Saint-Polycarpe by the merger of the Village of Saint-Polycarpe and the Parish of Saint-Polycarpe.
The Parish of Saint-Marcel became the Municipality of Saint-Marcel-de-Richelieu.

1989 

 1 January: 
Creation of the Municipality of Cantley from territories taken from the City of Gatineau.
The Township of Letellier and the United Townships of Les Sept-Cantons-Unis-du-Saguenay are closed and dissolved.
 7 January: The Municipality of Fleuriault is annexed by the Municipality of Saint-Gabriel.
 22 March: Creation of the Municipality of Vallée-Jonction by the merger of the Village of Vallée-Jonction and the Parish of L’Enfant-Jésus.
 1 April:
The Parish of Notre-Dame-de-Bon-Secours became a Municipality.
The Parish of Saint-Dunstan-du-Lac-Beauport became the Municipality of Lac-Beauport.
The Township of Ascot became a Municipality.
 8 April: The Township of Ristigouche became the Municipality of Saint-André-de-Restigouche.
 26 April: Creation of the Municipality of Sainte-Angèle-de-Mérici by the merger of the Village of Sainte-Angèle-de-Mérici and the Parish of Sainte-Angèle-de-Mérici.
 10 May: Creation of the Municipality of Sainte-Anne-de-la-Pérade by the merger of the Village of La Pérade and the Parish of Sainte-Anne-de-la-Pérade.
 7 June: Creation of the Municipality of Sainte-Thècle by the merger of the Village of Sainte-Thècle and the Parish of Sainte-Thècle.
 2 August: The Municipality of Pointe-au-Père became a City.
 30 August: The Municipality of Laterrière became a City.
 1 September: Creation of the City of Lévis-Lauzon by the merger of the City of Lauzon and the City of Lévis.
 18 November: The City of Pointe-au-Père became a Municipality.
 29 November: Creation of the Municipality of L’Islet-sur-Mer by the merger of the Village of L’Islet-sur-Mer and the Parish of Notre-Dame-de-Bon-Secours-de-l’Islet.
 27 December: 
Creation of the Municipality of Deschambault by the merger of the Village of Deschambault and the Parish of Saint-Joseph-de-Deschambault.
The Village of Clarenceville is annexed by the Municipality of Saint-Georges-de-Clarenceville.

1990 

 1 January: Creation of the Municipality of Blanc-Sablon and the Municipality of Bonne-Espérance from territories taken from the Municipality of Côte-Nord-du-Golfe-Saint-Laurent.
 17 January: Creation of the Municipality of Rivière-Beaudette by the merger of the Village of Rivière-Beaudette and the Parish of Rivière-Beaudette.
 11 April: Creation of the Municipality of Albanel by the merger of the Village of Albanel and the Township of Albanel.
 18 April:
Creation of the Municipality of Port-Daniel by the merger of the Township of Port-Daniel-Partie-Est and the Township of Port-Daniel-Partie-Ouest.
The Village of Saint-Zacharie is annexed by the Municipality of Saint-Zacharie.
 25 April: Creation of the Municipality of Saint-Timothée by the merger of the Village of Saint-Timothée and the Parish of Saint-Timothée.
 28 April: The Township of Hull-Partie-Ouest became the Municipality of Chelsea.
 23 May: 
The City of Saint-Georges-Ouest is annexed by the City of Saint-Georges.
Creation of the Municipality of Deschaillons-sur-Saint-Laurent by the merger of the Village of Deschaillons and the Village of Deschaillons-sur-Saint-Laurent.
 1 August: The City of Saint-David-de-l’Auberivière is annexed by the City of Lévis-Lauzon.
 20 October: The Municipality of Pointe-au-Père became a City.

1991 
Twenty-seven municipality modifications were approved in 1991.
 1 January:
 Creation of the Communauté urbaine de l'Outaouais, comprising the cities of Aylmer, Buckingham, Gatineau, Hull, and Masson.
 Creation of Les Collines-de-l'Outaouais Regional County Municipality.
 The Communauté régionale de l'Outaouais became defunct in conjunction with the above.
 16 January: The Parish of Saint-Benoît-Joseph-Labre is annexed by the City of Amqui.
 2 February:
 The Municipality of Grantham-Ouest changed its name to Grantham.
 The Municipality of Saint-Godard-de-Lejeune changed its name to Lejeune.
 The Municipality of Saint-Juste-de-Bretenières changed its name to Saint-Just-de-Bretenières.
 The Village of Annaville changed its name to Saint-Célestin.
 The Village of Saint-Émile became a Municipality.
 The Parish of Sacré-Coeur-de-Jésus became the Municipality of Sacré-Coeur-de-Crabtree.
 The Parish of Sainte-Martine became a Municipality.
 The Township of Windsor became the Municipality of Val-Joli.
 9 February:
 The Village of Sainte-Clothilde-de-Horton changed its name to Sainte-Clotilde-de-Horton.
 The Parish of Saint-Janvier became the Municipality of Chazel.
 13 February: The Municipality of Entrelacs moved from Les Pays-d'en-Haut Regional County Municipality to Matawinie Regional County Municipality, and therefore from Laurentides region to Lanaudière region.
 9 March: The City of Lévis-Lauzon changed its name to Lévis.
 23 March: The Township of Marchand became a Municipality.
 17 April: The Parish of Saint-Ours is annexed by the City of Saint-Ours.
 20 April: The Parish of Saint-Alphonse-de-Rodriguez became the Municipality of Saint-Alphonse-Rodriguez.
 4 May:
 The Parish of Saint-Mathias-sur-Richelieu became a Municipality.
 The Parish of Sainte-Agathe became the Municipality of Sainte-Agathe-Nord.
 31 May: The City of Gagnon is closed and dissolved.
 14 September:
 The Parish of Saint-Épiphane became a Municipality.
 The Parish of Sainte-Christine became the Municipality of Sainte-Christine-d'Auvergne.
 21 September: The Parish of Saint-Bonaventure became a Municipality.
 5 October: The Parish of Saint-Luc became the Municipality of Saint-Luc-de-Vincennes.
 13 November: Creation of the Municipality of Chertsey by the merger of the Parish of Lac-Paré and the Township of Chertsey.
 23 November:
 The Village of Saint-Jean-de-Boischatel became the Municipality of Boischatel.
 The Parish of Saints-Gervais-et-Protais became the Municipality of Saint-Gervais.
 31 December: Creation of the Municipality of Saint-Alban by the merger of the Village of Saint-Alban and the Parish of Saint-Alban.

1992 
Fifteen municipality modifications were approved in 1992.
 22 January: The Parish of Saint-Thomas moved from D'Autray Regional County Municipality to Joliette Regional County Municipality.
 29 January: The Parish of Saint-Pierre-de-Sorel is annexed by the City of Sorel.
 22 April: The Parish of L'Assomption is annexed by the City of L'Assomption.
 16 May: The Parish of Saint-Élie-d'Orford became a Municipality.
 6 June: The Parish of Notre-Dame-des-Prairies became a Municipality.
 13 June:
 The Parish of Saint-Michel became the Municipality of Saint-Michel-de-Bellechasse.
 The Township of Stoke became a Municipality.
 18 July: The City of Masson changed its name to Masson-Angers.
 8 August:
 The Parish of Saint-Lin became a Municipality.
 The Parish of Sainte-Mélanie became a Municipality.
 15 August:
 The Township of Hinchinbrook changed its name to Hinchinbrooke.
 The Unorganized Territory of Lac-Fériol changed its name to Lac-aux-Castors.
 The Unorganized Territory of Lac-Marie-Lefranc changed its name to Lac-Marie-Le Franc.
 The Cree Reserved Land of Mistassini was renamed to Mistissini.
 3 October: The United Townships of Risborough-et-Partie-de-Marlow became the Municipality of Risborough.
 24 October: The Parish of Saint-Barnabé became the Municipality of Saint-Barnabé-Sud.
 5 December:
 The Parish of Saint-Mathieu-de-Beloeil became a Municipality.
 The Township of Montcalm became a Municipality.

1993 
Thirty-one municipality modifications were approved in 1993.
 1 January: Creation of the Municipality of Saint-Augustin from territories taken from the Municipality of Côte-Nord-du-Golfe-Saint-Laurent.
 6 March: The Parish of Sainte-Béatrix became a Municipality.
 10 March: 
Creation of the Municipality of Saint-Vallier by the merger of the Village of Saint-Vallier and the Parish of Saint-Vallier. 
Creation of the Municipality of Wotton by the merger of the Village of Wottonville and the Township of Wotton.
 1 May: The Parish of Saint-Mathieu became the Municipality of Saint-Mathieu-d'Harricana.
 15 May: 
The Parish of Saint-Armand-Ouest became the Municipality of Saint-Armand.
The Parish of Saint-Benoît-Labre became a Municipality.
The Parish of Saint-Blaise became the Municipality of Saint-Blaise-sur-Richelieu. 
The Parish of Saint-Jean-de-Matha became a Municipality.
The Township of Ponsonby became the Municipality of Boileau.
 31 May: Creation of the Indian settlement of Oujé-Bougoumou from territories taken from the Municipality of Baie-James.
 12 June: 
The Village of Crabtree became a Municipality.
The Parish of Saint-Thomas became a Municipality.
The Parish of Sainte-Justine became a Municipality.
 23 June: Creation of the City of Victoriaville-Arthabaska by the merger of the City of Arthabaska, the City of Victoriaville, and the Parish of Sainte-Victoire-d'Arthabaska.
 21 July: 
The Municipality of Fleurimont became a City.
The Municipality of Saint-Émile became a City.
the Parish of Saint-Louis-de-France became a City.
 25 August: The Municipality of Haute-Mauricie is annexed by the City of La Tuque.
 22 September: Creation of the Municipality of Saint-Isidore by the merger of the Village of Saint-Isidore and the Parish of Saint-Isidore.
 30 October: The Parish of Saint-François-Xavier-des-Hauteurs became the Municipality of Hauteurs.
 7 November: Elections were held in nearly all municipalities of Quebec.
 8 December: Creation of the Municipality of Saint-Raphaël by the merger of the Village of Saint-Raphaël and the Parish of Saint-Raphaël.
 18 December: 
The Municipality of Sainte-Marthe-du-Cap-de-la-Madeleine changed its name to Sainte-Marthe-du-Cap.
The Municipality of Stukely-Sud changed its name to Stukely.
The Parish of Saint-Venant-de-Hereford became the Municipality of Saint-Venant-de-Paquette.
The Township of Shipton became a Municipality. 
 22 December: 
The Municipality of Grantham is annexed by the City of Drummondville.
Creation of the Municipality of Saint-Charles-de-Bellechasse by the merger of the Village of Saint-Charles and the Parish of Saint-Charles-Borromée.
 24 December: The Indian reserve of Sept-Îles changed its name to Uashat.
 29 December: Creation of the Municipality of Armagh by the merger of the Village of Armagh and the Parish of Saint-Cajetan-d'Armagh.

1994 
Twenty-seven municipality modifications were approved in 1994.
 1 January: Creation of the Municipality of Gros-Mécatina from territories taken from the Municipality of Côte-Nord-du-Golfe-Saint-Laurent.
 5 January: 
Creation of the Municipality of Barraute by the merger of the Municipality of Fiedmont-et-Barraute and the Village of Barraute. 
Creation of the Municipality of L'Île-aux-Coudres by the merger of the Municipality of Saint-Bernard-de-l'Île-aux-Coudres and the Parish of Saint-Louis-de-l'Isle-aux-Coudres.
The Village of East Broughton Station is annexed by the Municipality of East Broughton.
 16 February: Creation of the Municipality of Lorrainville by the merger of the Parish of Notre-Dame-de-Lourdes-de-Lorrainville and the Village of Lorrainville.
 19 February: 
The Parish of Sainte-Émilie-de-l’Énergie became the Municipality of Sainte-Émélie-de-l'Énergie. 
The United Townships of Suffolk-et-Addington became the Municipality of Saint-Émile-de-Suffolk.
 16 March: Creation of the City of Vaudreuil-Dorion by the merger of the City of Dorion and the City of Vaudreuil.
 13 April:
Creation of the Municipality of Saint-Côme-de-Linière by the merger of the Village of Linière and the Parish of Saint-Côme-de-Kennebec.
Creation of the Municipality of Saint-Léonard-d'Aston by the merger of the Municipality of Saint-Léonard and the Village of Saint-Léonard-d'Aston.
 18 May: Creation of the Municipality of Coteaux by the merger of the Village of Coteau-Landing and the Village Coteau-Station.
 8 June: The Municipality of Saint-Timothée became a City.
 22 June: Creation of the Municipality of Compton by the merger of the Village of Compton and the Township of Compton.
 23 July:
The City of Victoriaville-Arthabaska changed its name to Victoriaville.
The Parish of Saint-Marc-sur-Richelieu became a Municipality.
The Township of Kiamika became a Municipality. 
 3 August: Creation of the Municipality of Saint-Placide by the merger of the Village of Saint-Placide and the Parish of Saint-Placide..
 17 August: 
The Municipality of Saint-Côme-de-Linière changed its name to Saint-Côme-Linière.
Creation of the Municipality of Saint-Liboire by the merger of the Village of Saint-Liboire and the Parish of Saint-Liboire.
 10 September: The Parish of Saint-Lazare became the Municipality of Saint-Lazare-de-Bellechasse.
 21 September: Creation of the City of Bernières–Saint-Nicolas by the merger of the City of Saint-Nicolas and the Municipality of Bernières.
 24 September:
The Municipality of Hauteurs changed its name to Les Hauteurs. 
The Indian reserves of Maniwaki and Restigouche changed their names to Kitigan Zibi and Listiguj.
 30 November: 
Creation of the Municipality of Saint-Elzéar by the merger of the Village of Saint-Elzéar and the Municipality of Saint-Elzéar-de-Beauce. 
Creation of the Municipality of Saint-Georges-de-Windsor by the merger of the Village of Saint-Georges-de-Windsor and the Township of Saint-Georges-de-Windsor. 
Creation of the Municipality of Saint-Norbert-d'Arthabaska by the merger of the Municipality of Chester-Nord and the Parish of Saint-Norbert-d'Arthabaska.
 14 December: The Municipality of Rivière-Blanche is annexed by the City of Thetford Mines.
 21 December: Creation of the Municipality of Mont-Saint-Grégoire by the merger of the Village of Mont-Saint-Grégoire and the Parish of Saint-Grégoire-le-Grand.

1995 
Twenty-seven municipality modifications were approved in 1995.
 1 January: Annexation of the Unorganized Territories of Lac-aux-Castors and Lac-Marie-Le Franc to the Township of La Minerve.
 11 February: The Village of McMasterville became a Municipality.
 15 February: 
Creation of the City of La Malbaie-Pointe-au-Pic by the merger of the City of La Malbaie and the Village of Pointe-au-Pic.
Creation of the City of Stanstead by the merger of the City of Rock Island, the Village of Beebe Plain and the Village of Stanstead Plain.
The Municipality of Brompton Gore is annexed by the Municipality of Racine.
 22 February: Creation of the Municipality of Saint-Germain-de-Grantham by the merger of the Village of Saint-Germain-de-Grantham and the Parish of Saint-Germain-de-Grantham.
 4 March: 
The Municipality of Saint-Jacques-de-Dupuy changed its name to Dupuy.
The Parish of Saint-Antoine-de-Tilly became a Municipality.
 8 March: The Nordic village of Povungnituk changed its name to Puvirnituq.
 22 March: 
Creation of the Municipality of Saint-Charles-sur-Richelieu by the merger of the Village of Saint-Charles-sur-Richelieu and the Parish of Saint-Charles.
The Parish of Saint-Raphaël-de-l’Île-Bizard became the City of L’Île-Bizard.
 29 March: 
Creation of the Municipality of Scott by the merger of the Village of Scott and the Municipality of Taschereau-Fortier.
The Parish of Saint-Raymond is annexed by the City of Saint-Raymond.
 22 April: The Village of Daveluyville became a Municipality.
 6 May: The Parish of Saint-Bruno-de-Guigues became a Municipality.
 27 May: The Parish of Saint-Augustin-de-Desmaures became a Municipality.
 26 June: The Municipality of Coteaux changed its name to Les Coteaux.
 28 June: The Parish of La Plaine became a City.
 2 September: The Township of Halifax-Sud became the Municipality of Saint-Ferdinand.
 27 September: 
Creation of the Municipality of Dixville by the merger of the Municipality of Saint-Mathieu-de-Dixville and the Village of Dixville. 
Creation of the Municipality of Hatley by the merger of the Village of Hatley and the Township of Hatley-Partie-Ouest.
 7 October: Annexation of the Unorganized Territory of Roulier to the Township of Nédélec.
 11 October: 
Creation of the Municipality of Dudswell by the merger of the Village of Bishopton, the Village of Marbleton and the Township of Dudswell.
The Village of Saint-Wenceslas is annexed by the Municipality of Saint-Wenceslas. 
 8 November: Creation of the Municipality of Saint-Guillaume by the merger of the Village of Saint-Guillaume and the Parish of Saint-Guillaume.
 29 November: Creation of the Municipality of Rigaud by the merger of the City of Rigaud and the Parish of Sainte-Madeleine-de-Rigaud.
 9 December: Annexation of the Unorganized Territories of Lac-Marcotte and Lac-au-Sorcier to the Parish of Saint-Alexis-des-Monts.
 13 December: The Municipality of Saint-Guillaume-de Granada is annexed by the City of Rouyn-Noranda.

1996 
Twenty-one municipality modifications were approved in 1996.
 3 January: 
Creation of the City of Pont-Rouge by the merger of the Municipality of Sainte-Jeanne-de-Pont-Rouge and the Village of Pont-Rouge. 
The Municipality of Rivière-du-Gouffre and the Parish of Baie-Saint-Paul are annexed by the City of Baie-Saint-Paul.
Creation of the Municipality of Saint-Faustin-Lac-Carré by the merger of the Municipality of Saint-Faustin and the Village of Lac-Carré.
Creation of the Municipality of Sainte-Monique by the merger of the Village of Sainte-Monique and the Parish of Sainte-Monique. 
 10 January: Creation of the Municipality of Sainte-Félicité by the merger of the Village of Sainte-Félicité and the Parish of Sainte-Félicité.
 16 March: The Parish of Saint-Jude became a Municipality.
 8 May:
 The Municipality of Côte-Nord-du-Golfe-Saint-Laurent changed its name to Côte-Nord-du-Golfe-du-Saint-Laurent.
 The Cree Village of Fort-Rupert changed its name to Waskaganish.
 The Cree Village of Mistassini changed its name to Mistissini.
 The Cree Village of Poste-de-la-Baleine changed its name to Whapmagoostui.
 The Naskapi Village Municipality of Schefferville was renamed to Kawawachikamach.
 25 May: The Municipality of Notre-Dame-de-Lourdes-de-Ham changed its name to Notre-Dame-de-Ham.
 8 June: The Parish of Saint-Octave-de-Dosquet became the Municipality of Dosquet.
 12 June:
 The Municipality of Saint-Méthode is annexed by the City of Saint-Félicien.
 The City of Bromptonville moved from Le Val-Saint-François Regional County Municipality to Sherbrooke Regional County Municipality.
 The Township of Brompton moved from Le Val-Saint-François Regional County Municipality to Sherbrooke Regional County Municipality.
 6 July: Annexation of the Unorganized Territories of Lac-Mingo and Lac-Quentin to the City of Senneterre.
 3 August: The Parish of Saint-Philippe became a Municipality.
 21 August: Creation of the Municipality of Chénéville by the merger of the Municipality of Vinoy and the Village of Chénéville.
 24 August: The City of Bernières-Saint-Nicolas changed its name to Saint-Nicolas.
 23 October: The Municipality of Sacré-Coeur-de-Crabtree is annexed by the Municipality of Crabtree.
 4 December: Creation of the Municipality of Saint-Sylvestre by the merger of the Village of Saint-Sylvestre and the Parish of Saint-Sylvestre.
 11 December: Creation of the Municipality of Weedon by the merger of the Village of Weedon-Centre and the Township of Weedon.
 14 December:
The Village of Pointe-Calumet became a Municipality.
The Parish of L'Ascension became a Municipality. 
 31 December: Creation of the Municipality of Saint-Victor by the merger of the Village of Saint-Victor and the Municipality of Saint-Victor-de-Tring.

1997 
Fifty-seven municipality modifications were approved in 1997.
 2 January: Creation of the City of Neuville by the merger of the Village of Neuville and the Parish of Pointe-aux-Trembles.
 29 January: The Municipality of Lac-Dufault is annexed by the City of Rouyn-Noranda.
 26 March:
 Creation of the Municipality of Aston-Jonction by the merger of the Village of Aston-Jonction and the Parish of Saint-Raphaël-Partie-Sud.
 Creation of the Municipality of Sainte-Clotilde-de-Horton by the merger of the Municipality of Saint-Jacques-de-Horton, the Village of Sainte-Clotilde-de-Horton, the Parish of Sainte-Clothilde-de-Horton.
 5 April:
 The Municipality of Longue-Pointe changed its name to Longue-Pointe-de-Mingan.
 The Village of Deauville became a Municipality.
 The Parish of Bellefeuille became a City.
 12 April: The Parish of Saint-Urbain-Premier became a Municipality.
 30 April: The Municipality of Saint-Malo moved from Le Haut-Saint-François Regional County Municipality to Coaticook Regional County Municipality.
 3 May:
 The Municipality of Bonaventure became a City.
 The Municipality of Contrecoeur became a City.
 The Municipality of Lac-Saint-Charles became a City.
 28 May: Creation of the Municipality of Saint-Paul-du-Nord-Sault-au-Mouton by the merger of the Municipality of Saint-Paul-du-Nord and the Village of Sault-au-Mouton.
 14 June: The Village of Lafontaine became a City.
 28 June: The Parish of Saint-Fidèle-de-Mont-Murray became the Municipality of Saint-Fidèle.
 5 July:
 The Parish of Saint-Alexandre became the Municipality of Saint-Alexandre-de-Kamouraska.
 The Parish of Saint-Luc became the Municipality of Saint-Luc-de-Matane.
 The United Townships of Waltham-et-Bryson became the Municipality of Waltham.
 19 July:
 The Municipality of Saint-Norbert-de-Mont-Brun changed its name to Mont-Brun.
 The Village of Saint-Gédéon became the Municipality of Saint-Gédéon-de-Beauce.
 The Parish of Saint-Bernard-Partie-Sud became the Municipality of Saint-Bernard-de-Michaudville.
 The Parish of Saint-Hubert became the Municipality of Saint-Hubert-de-Rivière-du-Loup.
 The Township of Stanbridge became the Municipality of Stanbridge East.
 26 July: The Parish of Saint-Albert-de-Warwick became the Municipality of Saint-Albert.
 16 August:
 The Municipality of Saint-Magloire-de-Bellechasse changed its name to Saint-Magloire.
 The Parish of Saint-Raphaël-d'Albertville became the Municipality of Albertville.
 20 August:
 The Municipality of Paspébiac-Ouest is annexed by the Municipality of Paspébiac.
 The administrative region of Mauricie–Bois-Francs was split into the administrative regions of Mauricie and Centre-du-Québec.
 23 August:
 The Indian reserve of Les Escoumins changed its name to Essipit.
 The Unorganized Territory of Lac-Bricault changed its name to Lac-Metei.
 The Indian reserve of Manouane changed its name to Manawan.
 The Indian reserve of Weymontachie changed its name to Wemotaci.
 27 August: The Village of Mont-Rolland is annexed by the City of Sainte-Adèle.
 13 September:
 The Municipality of Saint-Honoré changed its name to Saint-Honoré-de-Témiscouata.
 The Parish of Saint-Joseph-du-Lac became a Municipality.
 The Parish of Saint-Pierre (Capitale-Nationale) became the Municipality of Saint-Pierre-de-L'Île-d'Orléans.
 27 September:
 The Municipality of Saint-Eugène changed its name to Saint-Eugène-d'Argentenay.
 The Parish of Notre-Dame-des-Neiges-des-Trois-Pistoles became the Municipality of Notre-Dame-des-Neiges.
 11 October: The Parish of Saint-Luc became the Municipality of Saint-Luc-de-Bellechasse.
 18 October: The Parish of Saint-Cléophas became the Municipality of Saint-Cléophas-de-Brandon.
 2 November: Elections were held in nearly all municipalities of Quebec.
 26 November: Creation of the Municipality of Laurierville by the merger of the Municipality of Sainte-Julie and the Village of Laurierville.
 6 December: The Parish of Saint-Édouard-de-Frampton became the Municipality of Frampton.
 17 December:
 Creation of the City of Dolbeau-Mistassini by the merger of the City of Dolbeau and the City of Mistassini.
 Creation of the Municipality of Lac-au-Saumon by the merger of the Municipality of Saint-Edmond and the Village of Lac-au-Saumon.
 Creation of the Municipality of Roxton Pond by the merger of the Village of Roxton Pond and the Parish of Roxton Pond.
 Creation of the Municipality of Saint-André-Avellin by the merger of the Village of Saint-André-Avellin and the Parish of Saint-André-Avellin.
 Creation of the Municipality of Sainte-Sophie-d'Halifax by the merger of the Municipality of Sainte-Sophie and the Township of Halifax-Nord.
 24 December:
 Creation of the Municipality of Ferme-Neuve by the merger of the Village of Ferme-Neuve and the Parish of Ferme-Neuve.
 The Municipality of Fontainebleau is annexed by the Municipality of Weedon.
 Creation of the Municipality of La Patrie by the merger of the Village of La Patrie and the Township of Ditton.
 Creation of the Municipality of Saint-Denis-sur-Richelieu by the merger of the Village of Saint-Denis and the Parish of Saint-Denis.
 Creation of the Municipality of Saint-Éphrem-de-Beauce by the merger of the Village of Saint-Éphrem-de-Tring and the Parish of Saint-Éphrem-de-Beauce.
 Creation of the Municipality of Saint-Félix-de-Valois by the merger of the Village of Saint-Félix-de-Valois and the Parish of Saint-Félix-de-Valois.
 Creation of the Municipality of Saint-Isidore-de-Clifton by the merger of the Municipality of Saint-Isidore-d'Auckland and the Township of Clifton-Partie-Est.
 31 December:
 Creation of the Municipality of Ange-Gardien by the merger of the Village of L'Ange-Gardien and the Parish of Saint-Ange-Gardien.
 Creation of the Municipality of Manseau by the merger of the Village of Manseau and the Parish of Saint-Joseph-de-Blandford.
 Creation of the Municipality of Saint-François-du-Lac by the merger of the Village and the Parish of Saint-François-du-Lac.
 The Village of Kingsey Falls is annexed by the Municipality of Kingsey Falls.
 The Parish of Saint-Jacques-le-Majeur-de-Causapscal is annexed by the City of Causapscal.

1998 
Thirty-one municipality modifications were approved in 1998.
 7 January:
 Creation of the Municipality of Saint-Anselme by the merger of the Village of Saint-Anselme and the Parish of Saint-Anselme.
 Creation of the Municipality of Saint-Cuthbert by the merger of the Parish of Saint-Cuthbert and the Parish of Saint-Viateur.
 31 January:
 The Municipality of Saint-Gabriel changed its name to Saint-Gabriel-de-Rimouski.
 The Parish of Saint-Étienne-de-Beaumont became the Municipality of Beaumont.
 4 February: Creation of the Municipality of Saint-Jacques by the merger of the Village of Saint-Jacques and the Parish of Saint-Jacques.
 25 February:
 The Municipality of Saint-François-de-Beauce and the Municipality of Saint-François-Ouest are annexed by the City of Beauceville.
 Creation of the Municipality of Saint-Ludger by the merger of the Municipality of Risborough, the Village of Saint-Ludger and the Township of Gayhurst-Partie-Sud-Est.
 Creation of the Municipality of Upton by the merger of the Village of Upton and the Parish of Saint-Éphrem-d'Upton.
 14 March: The Municipality of Sainte-Marthe-du-Cap became a City.
 28 March: The Parish of Saint-Mathieu became the Municipality of Saint-Mathieu-du-Parc.
 4 April: The Parish of Sainte-Julienne became a Municipality.
 28 May: Creation of the Municipality of Rawdon by the merger of the Village of Rawdon and the Township of Rawdon.
 3 June: Creation of the Municipality of Fortierville by the merger of the Village of Fortierville and the Parish of Sainte-Philomène-de-Fortierville.
 6 June: The Parish of Saint-Laurent (Capitale-Nationale) became the Municipality of Saint-Laurent-de-l'Île-d'Orléans.
 11 July: The Municipality of Saint-Joseph-de-Cléricy changed its name to Cléricy.
 2 September: The Village of Baie-de-Shawinigan is annexed by the City of Shawinigan.
 5 September: The Parish of Notre-Dame-de-l'Île-Perrot became a Municipality.
 9 September: Creation of the Municipality of Inverness by the merger of the Village of Inverness and the Township of Inverness.
 12 September: Sherbrooke Regional County Municipality changed its name to La Région-Sherbrookoise Regional County Municipality.
 26 September: The Township of La Minerve became a Municipality.
 10 October:
 The Municipality of Saint-Paul-du-Nord-Sault-au-Mouton changed its name to Longue-Rive.
 Division of the Unorganized Territory of Lac-des-Écorces: Annexation in part to Duhamel and of the remainder to the Municipality of Montpellier.
 17 October: The Parish of Saint-Roch-de-Richelieu became a Municipality.
 4 November: The Parish of Saint-Jean-Baptiste (Montérégie) moved from Rouville Regional County Municipality to La Vallée-du-Richelieu Regional County Municipality.
 23 December: The Parish of Saint-Tite is annexed by the City of Saint-Tite.
 26 December: The Municipality of Boucher changed its name to Trois-Rives.
 30 December:
 Creation of the Municipality of L'Isle-aux-Allumettes by the merger of the Village of Chapeau, the Townships of L'Isle-aux-Allumettes and L'Isle-aux-Allumettes-Partie-Est.
 The Parish of Saint-Patrice-de-la-Rivière-du-Loup is annexed by the City of Rivière-du-Loup.
 The Township of Barford and the Township of Barnston are annexed by the City of Coaticook.
 The Township of Brompton is annexed by the City of Bromptonville.

1999 
Twenty-nine municipality modifications were approved in 1999.
 1 January: The Village of Sainte-Agathe-Sud is annexed by the City of Sainte-Agathe-des-Monts.
 6 January: Creation of the City of Métabetchouan-Lac-à-la-Croix by the merger of the City of Métabetchouan and the Municipality of Lac-à-la-Croix.
 27 January: The Parish of Saint-Joseph-de-Beauce is annexed by the City of Saint-Joseph-de-Beauce.
 3 February:.
 Creation of the Municipality of Sainte-Agathe-de-Lotbinière by the merger of the Village of Sainte-Agathe and the Parish of Sainte-Agathe.
 The Village of Philipsburg is annexed by the Municipality of Saint-Armand.
 6 March: The Parish of Saint-Zénon became a Municipality.
 17 March: The Municipality of Shipton is annexed by the City of Danville.
 20 March: The Municipality of Saint-Nicéphore became a City.
 3 April: The Village of Sainte-Rosalie became a City.
 1 May: The Municipality of Paspébiac became a City.
 8 May: The Municipality of Prévost became a City.
 2 June: Creation of the Municipality of Cascapédia by the merger of the Municipality of Grande-Cascapédia and the Municipality of Saint-Jules.
 26 June: The Municipality of Saint-Pierre-de-L'Île-d'Orléans changed (corrected) its name to Saint-Pierre-de-l'Île-d'Orléans.
 17 July: Pabok Regional County Municipality changed its name to Le Rocher-Percé Regional County Municipality.
 8 September:
 The Municipality of Saint-Paul-de-Châteauguay is annexed by the Municipality of Sainte-Martine.
 The Parish of Oka is annexed by the Municipality of Oka.
 29 September: Creation of the Municipality of Saint-Chrysostome by the merger of the Village of Saint-Chrysostome and the Parish of Saint-Jean-Chrysostome.
 6 October: Creation of the Municipality of Brownsburg-Chatham by the merger of the Village of Brownsburg and the Township of Chatham.
 23 October:
 The Indian settlement of Grand-Lac-Victoria changed its name to Kitcisakik.
 The Indian reserve of Timiscaming changed its name to Timiskaming.
 13 November:
 The Municipality of Kingsey changed its name to Saint-Félix-de-Kingsey.
 The Township of Langelier became the Municipality of La Croche.
 1 December: Creation of the City of La Malbaie by the merger of the City of La Malbaie-Pointe-au-Pic, the Municipality of Rivière-Malbaie, the Municipality of Saint-Fidèle, the Village of Cap-à-l'Aigle and the Parish of Sainte-Agnès.
 8 December:
 The Municipality of Compton-Station is annexed by the Municipality of Compton.
 The Municipality of Trois-Lacs is annexed by the City of Asbestos.
 15 December:
 The Village of Henryville is annexed by the Municipality of Henryville.
 The Municipality of Ulverton moved from Drummond Regional County Municipality to Le Val-Saint-François Regional County Municipality, and therefore from the Centre-du-Québec region to the Estrie region.
 29 December:
 Creation of the Municipality of Les Bergeronnes by the merger of the Village of Grandes-Bergeronnes and the Township of Bergeronnes.
 Creation of the Municipality of Saint-André-Carillon by the merger of the Village of Carillon, the Village of Saint-André-Est and the Parish of Saint-André-d'Argenteuil.
 Creation of the Municipality of Saint-Flavien by the merger of the Village of Saint-Flavien and the Parish of Saint-Flavien.
 The Village of Melbourne is annexed by the City of Richmond.
 The Village of Saint-Grégoire-de-Greenlay is annexed by the City of Windsor.
 The Unorganized Territory of Lac-Cabasta is created from part of the territory of the Unorganized Territory of Lac-Bazinet, as a result of a reinterpretation of the boundary between Antoine-Labelle Regional County Municipality and Matawinie Regional County Municipality.  The date of creation is deemed to be retroactive to January 1, 1986.

21st century

2000 
Forty-seven municipality modifications were approved in 2000.
 1 January:
 The City of Saint-Pierre is annexed by the City of Lachine.
 Creation of the Municipality of L'Islet-sur-Mer-Saint-Eugène-l'Islet by the merger of the City of L'Islet, the Municipality of L'Islet-sur-Mer and the Parish of Saint-Eugène.
 5 January (amended 21 January): Québec administrative region changed its name to Capitale-Nationale administrative region.
 12 January: Creation of the Municipality of Rivière-Blanche by the merger of the Village of Saint-Ulric and the Parish of Saint-Ulric-de-Matane.
 26 January:
 Creation of the Municipality of Leclercville by the merger of the Village of Leclercville and the Parish of Sainte-Emmélie.
 Creation of the Municipality of Ormstown by the merger of the Village of Ormstown and the Parish of Saint-Malachie-d'Ormstown.
 Creation of the Municipality of Rougemont by the merger of the Village of Rougemont and the Parish of Saint-Michel-de-Rougemont.
 The Parish of Saint-André-d'Acton is annexed by the City of Acton Vale.
 The Parish of Saint-Césaire is annexed by the City of Saint-Césaire.
 2 February: Creation of the City of Sainte-Anne-des-Monts-Tourelle by the merger of the City of Sainte-Anne-des-Monts and the Municipality of Tourelle.
 9 February:
 The Municipality of Beaudry is annexed by the City of Rouyn-Noranda.
 Creation of the Municipality of L'Isle-Verte by the merger of the Village of L'Isle-Verte and the Municipality of Saint-Jean-Baptiste-de-l'Isle-Verte.
 The Village of Saint-Gérard is annexed by the Municipality of Weedon.
 23 February: The Parish of Princeville is annexed by the City of Princeville.
 1 March:
 Creation of the City of Saint-Basile by the merger of the Village of Saint-Basile-Sud and the Parish of Saint-Basile.
 Creation of the City of Saint-Lin-Laurentides by the merger of the City of Laurentides and the Municipality of Saint-Lin.
 The Municipality of Saint-Pascal is annexed by the City of Saint-Pascal.
 8 March: The Municipality of Rainville is annexed by the City of Farnham.
 15 March:
 Creation of the City of Sorel-Tracy by the merger of the City of Sorel and the City of Tracy.
 Creation of the Municipality of Beaulac-Garthby by the merger of the Village of Beaulac and the Township of Garthby.
 The Municipality of Capucins is annexed by the City of Cap-Chat.
 The Municipality of Notre-Dame-de-Bon-Secours is annexed by the City of Richelieu.
 The Township of Warwick is annexed by the City of Warwick.
 8 April: The Municipality of Daveluyville became a City.
 19 April: Creation of the Municipality of Saint-Honoré-de-Shenley by the merger of the Parish of Saint-Honoré and the Township of Shenley.
 3 May:
 Creation of the Municipality of Ripon by the merger of the Village of Ripon and the Township of Ripon.
 The Village of New-Glasgow is annexed by the Municipality of Sainte-Sophie.
 27 May: Denis-Riverin Regional County Municipality changed its name to La Haute-Gaspésie Regional County Municipality.
 14 June:
 The Village of L'Île-d'Entrée is annexed by the Municipality of L’Île-du-Havre-Aubert.
 The Parish of Sainte-Marie-de-Monnoir is annexed by the City of Marieville.
 21 June: The Parish of Saint-Casimir is annexed by the Municipality of Saint-Casimir.
 26 June: The Municipality of Cascapédia changed its name to Cascapédia-Saint-Jules.
 1 July: The Parish of Saint-Gérard-Majella is annexed by the City of L'Assomption.
 23 August: Creation of the Municipality of L'Isle-aux-Coudres by the merger of the Municipality of L'Île-aux-Coudres and the Municipality of La Baleine.
 16 September:
 The Municipality of Kingsey Falls became a City.
 The Municipality of Lac-Nominingue changed its name to Nominingue.
 The Parish of Saint-Esprit became a Municipality.
 4 October: Creation of the City of Carleton-Saint-Omer by the merger of the City of Carleton and the Parish of Saint-Omer.
 28 October: The Parish of Larouche became a Municipality.
 11 November:
 The Municipality of L'Islet-sur-Mer-Saint-Eugène-l'Islet changed its name to L'Islet.
 The Municipality of Rivière-Blanche changed its name to Saint-Ulric.
 18 November: The Parish of Sainte-Anne-du-Sault became a Municipality.
 22 November: Creation of the City of Mont-Tremblant by the merger of the City of Saint-Jovite, the Municipality of Lac-Tremblant-Nord, the Municipality of Mont-Tremblant and the Parish of Saint-Jovite.
 25 November:
 The Municipality of Saint-André-Carillon changed its name to Saint-André-d'Argenteuil.
 The Village of Saint-Pie became a City.
 29 November:
 Creation of the Municipality of Papineauville by the merger of the Village of Papineauville and the Parish of Sainte-Angélique.
 The Municipality of Vianney and the Village of Bernierville are annexed by the Municipality of Saint-Ferdinand.
 6 December: Creation of the Municipality of Lanoraie by the merger of the Municipality of Lanoraie-d'Autray and the Parish of Saint-Joseph-de-Lanoraie.
 9 December: The Municipality of Sainte-Catherine-de-la-Jacques-Cartier became a City.
 27 December: The Municipality of Nicolet-Sud and the Parish of Saint-Jean-Baptiste-de-Nicolet are annexed by the City of Nicolet.
 30 December: The Municipality of Cap-Santé became a City.

2001 
Thirty-three municipality modifications were approved in 2001.
 1 January: Creation of the Montreal Metropolitan Community.
 17 January: Creation of the Municipality of Port-Daniel-Gascons by the merger of the Municipality of Port-Daniel and the Parish of Sainte-Germaine-de-l'Anse-aux-Gascons.
 24 January: Creation of the City of Saint-Jean-Iberville by the merger of the City of Iberville, the City of Saint-Jean-sur-Richelieu, the City of Saint-Luc, the Municipality of L'Acadie and the Parish of Saint-Athanase.
 10 February: The City of Sainte-Anne-des-Monts-Tourelle changed its name to Sainte-Anne-des-Monts.
 14 February: Creation of the Municipality of Adstock by the merger of the Municipality of Saint-Méthode-de-Frontenac and the Parish of Sacré-Coeur-de-Marie-Partie-Sud.
 21 February: The Municipality of Delisle is annexed by the City of Alma.
 25 April:
 Creation of the Municipality of Eaton by the merger of Village of Sawyerville and the Township of Eaton.
 Creation of the Municipality of Maskinongé by the merger of the Village of Maskinongé and the Parish of Saint-Joseph-de-Maskinongé.
 Creation of the Municipality of Saint-Siméon by the merger of the Village of Saint-Siméon and the Parish of Saint-Siméon.
 16 May: Creation of the City of Lavaltrie by the merger of the Village of Lavaltrie and the Parish of Saint-Antoine-de-Lavaltrie.
 26 May: The City of Saint-Jean-Iberville changed its name to Saint-Jean-sur-Richelieu.
 30 May: Creation of the Municipality of Eastman by the merger of the Municipality of Stukely and the Village of Eastman.
 2 June: The Municipality of Saint-Charles-de-Mandeville changed its name to Mandeville.
 13 June:
 Creation of the Municipality of Pierreville by the merger of the Village of Pierreville and the Parishes of Notre-Dame-de-Pierreville, Saint-Thomas-de-Pierreville.
 The Municipality of Saint-Jean-Baptiste is annexed by the City of Mont-Joli.
 The Parish of Macamic is annexed by the City of Macamic.
 27 June:
 The City of La Plaine and the City of Lachenaie are annexed by the City of Terrebonne.
 Creation of the City of Pabos by the merger of the City of Chandler, the Municipality of Newport, the Municipality of Pabos, the Municipality of Pabos Mills and the Municipality of Saint-François-de-Pabos.
 29 August: Creation of the Municipality of Sainte-Luce-Luceville by the merger of the Village of Luceville and the Parish of Sainte-Luce.
 13 September: Creation of the Municipality of Lacolle by the merger of the Village of Lacolle and the Parish of Notre-Dame-du-Mont-Carmel.
 19 September:
 Creation of the Municipality of Montcerf-Lytton by the merger of the Municipality of Montcerf and the Township of Lytton.
 The Village of Saint-Joseph-de-la-Rive is annexed by the Municipality of Les Éboulements.
 26 September:
 The Municipality of Aubert-Gallion and the Parish of Saint-Georges-Est are annexed by the City of Saint-Georges.
 The Municipality of Petit-Matane, the Municipality of Saint-Luc-de-Matane and the Parish of Saint-Jérôme-de-Matane are annexed by the City of Matane.
 5 October:
 Creation of the Municipality of Saint-Damase by the merger of the Village of Saint-Damase and Parish of Saint-Damase.
 Creation of the Municipality of Sainte-Croix by the merger of the Village of Sainte-Croix and Parish of Sainte-Croix.
 10 October: Creation of the Municipality of Lac-Etchemin by the merger of the City of Lac-Etchemin and the Parish of Sainte-Germaine-du-Lac-Etchemin.
 17 October:
 Creation of the City of Sainte-Marguerite-Estérel by the merger of the City of Estérel and the Parish of Sainte-Marguerite-du-Lac-Masson.
 The City of Black Lake, the Municipality of Pontbriand, the Village of Robertsonville and the Township of Thetford-Partie-Sud are annexed by the City of Thetford Mines.
 24 October: The Village of Sainte-Anne-du-Lac is annexed by the Municipality of Adstock.
 4 November: Elections were held in nearly all municipalities of Quebec.
 19 December: Creation of the Municipality of Yamaska by the merger of the Villages of Yamaska and Yamaska-Est and the Parish of Saint-Michel-d'Yamaska.
 27 December:
 The City of Sainte-Rosalie, the Parish of Notre-Dame-de-Saint-Hyacinthe, the Parish of Saint-Hyacinthe-le-Confesseur, the Parish of Saint-Thomas-d'Aquin and the Parish of Sainte-Rosalie are annexed by the City of Saint-Hyacinthe.
 The Village of Taschereau is annexed by the Municipality of Taschereau.
 29 December: The Parish of Saint-Lazare became a City.

2002 
Sixty-eight municipality modifications were approved in 2002.
 1 January:
The City of Anjou, the City of Baie-d'Urfé, the City of Beaconsfield, the City of Côte-Saint-Luc, the City of Dollard-des-Ormeaux, the City of Dorval, the City of Hampstead, the City of Kirkland, the City of L'Île-Bizard, the City of L'Île-Dorval, the City of Lachine, the City of Lasalle, the City of Mont-Royal, the City of Montréal-Est, the City of Montréal-Nord, the City of Montréal-Ouest, the City of Outremont, the City of Pierrefonds, the City of Pointe-Claire, the City of Roxboro, the City of Saint-Laurent, the City of Saint-Léonard, the City of Sainte-Anne-de-Bellevue, the City of Sainte-Geneviève, the City of Verdun, the City of Westmount and the Village of Senneville are annexed by the City of Montréal.
 The Montreal Urban Community became defunct in conjunction with the above.
 Creation of the Quebec Metropolitan Community.
 The City of Beauport, the City of Cap-Rouge, the City of Charlesbourg, the City of L'Ancienne-Lorette, the City of Lac-Saint-Charles, the City of Loretteville, the City of Saint-Émile, the City of Sainte-Foy, the City of Sillery, the City of Val-Bélair, the City of Vanier and the Municipality of Saint-Augustin-de-Desmaures are annexed by Quebec City.
 The Quebec City Urban Community (Communauté urbaine de Québec) became defunct in conjunction with the above.
 The City of Aylmer, the City of Buckingham, the City of Hull and the City of Masson-Angers are annexed by the City of Gatineau.
 The Outaouais Urban Community (Communauté urbaine de l'Outaouais) became defunct in conjunction with the above.
 The City of Boucherville, the City of Brossard, the City of Greenfield-Park, the City of LeMoyne, the City of Saint-Bruno-de-Montarville, the City of Saint-Hubert and the City of Saint-Lambert are annexed by the City of Longueuil.
 Champlain Regional County Municipality became defunct in conjunction with the above.
 The City of Bromptonville, the City of Fleurimont, the City of Lennoxville, the City of Rock-Forest, the Municipality of Ascot and the Municipality of Deauville are annexed by the City of Sherbrooke.
 The Municipality of Saint-Élie-d’Orford is dissolved and its territory is split between the City of Sherbrooke, the Parish of Saint-Denis-de-Brompton and the Township of Orford.
 La Région-Sherbrookoise Regional County Municipality became defunct in conjunction with the above.
 The City of Charny, the City of Saint-Jean-Chrysostome, the City of Saint-Nicolas, the City of Saint-Rédempteur, the City of Saint-Romuald, the Municipality of Pintendre, the Municipality of Saint-Étienne-de-Lauzon, the Parish of Saint-Joseph-de-la-Pointe-de-Lévy and the Parish of Sainte-Hélène-de-Breakeyville are annexed by the City of Lévis.
 Desjardins Regional County Municipality and Les Chutes-de-la-Chaudière Regional County Municipality became defunct in conjunction with the above.
 The City of Cap-de-la-Madeleine, the City of Saint-Louis-de-France, the City of Sainte-Marthe-du-Cap, the City of Trois-Rivières-Ouest and the Municipality of Pointe-du-Lac are annexed by the City of Trois-Rivières.
 Francheville Regional County Municipality became defunct in conjunction with the above.
 Les Chenaux Regional County Municipality was created in conjunction with the above, mostly from the parts of Francheville RCM that did not form the new Town of Trois-Rivières.
 The City of Grand-Mère, the City of Shawinigan-Sud, the Village of Saint-Georges, the Parish of Lac-à-la-Tortue, the Parish of Saint-Gérard-des-Laurentides and the Parish of Saint-Jean-des-Piles are annexed by the City of Shawinigan.
 Le Centre-de-la-Mauricie Regional County Municipality became defunct in conjunction with the above.
 The Unorganized Territories of Lac-des-Cinq and Lac-Wapizagonke were annexed into Shawinigan.
 The City of Bellefeuille, the City of Lafontaine and the City of Saint-Antoine are annexed by the City of Saint-Jérôme.
 The City of Pointe-au-Père, the Municipality of Mont-Lebel, the Village of Rimouski-Est, the Parish of Sainte-Blandine and the Parish of Sainte-Odile-de-Rimouski are annexed by the City of Rimouski.
 The City of Maple Grove and the Village of Melocheville are annexed by the City of Beauharnois.
 The City of Cadillac, the Municipality of Arntfield, the Municipality of Bellecombe, the Municipality of Cléricy, the Municipality of Cloutier, the Municipality of D’Alenbert, the Municipality of Destor, the Municipality of Évain, the Municipality of McWatters, the Municipality of Mont-Brun, the Municipality of Montbeillard and the Municipality of Rollet are annexed by the City of Rouyn-Noranda.
Rouyn-Noranda Regional County Municipality became defunct in conjunction with the above.
 The Municipality of Dubuisson, the Municipality of Sullivan, the Municipality of Val-Senneville and the Municipality of Vassan are annexed by the City of Val-d'Or.
 Creation of the Municipality of Les Îles-de-la-Madeleine by the merger of the Municipality of Fatima, the Municipality of Grande-Entrée, the Municipality of Grosse-Île, the Municipality of Havre-aux-Maisons, the Municipality of L’Étang-du-Nord, the Municipality of L’Île-du-Havre-Aubert and the Village of Cap-aux-Meules.
Les Îles-de-la-Madeleine Regional County Municipality became defunct in conjunction with the above.
 Laval Regional County Municipality and Mirabel Regional County Municipality became defunct.
 The Municipality of Charette moved from the defunct Le Centre-de-la-Mauricie Regional County Municipality to Maskinongé Regional County Municipality.
 The Village of Saint-Boniface-de-Shawinigan moved from the defunct Le Centre-de-la-Mauricie Regional County Municipality to Maskinongé Regional County Municipality.
 The Parish of Saint-Élie moved from the defunct Le Centre-de-la-Mauricie Regional County Municipality to Maskinongé Regional County Municipality.
 The Parish of Saint-Étienne-des-Grès moved from the defunct Francheville Regional County Municipality to Maskinongé Regional County Municipality.
 The Municipality of Saint-Henri moved from the defunct Desjardins Regional County Municipality to Bellechasse Regional County Municipality.
 The Parish of Saint-Lambert-de-Lauzon moved from the defunct Les Chutes-de-la-Chaudière Regional County Municipality to La Nouvelle-Beauce Regional County Municipality.
 The Parish of Saint-Mathieu-du-Parc moved from the defunct Le Centre-de-la-Mauricie Regional County Municipality to Maskinongé Regional County Municipality.
 The Town of Waterville moved from the defunct La Région-Sherbrookoise Regional County Municipality to Coaticook Regional County Municipality.
 The Municipality of Batiscan moved from the defunct Francheville Regional County Municipality to the new Les Chenaux Regional County Municipality.
 The Municipality of Champlain moved from the defunct Francheville Regional County Municipality to the new Les Chenaux Regional County Municipality.
 The Parish of Notre-Dame-du-Mont-Carmel moved from the defunct Le Centre-de-la-Mauricie Regional County Municipality to the new Les Chenaux Regional County Municipality.
 The Municipality of Saint-Luc-de-Vincennes moved from the defunct Francheville Regional County Municipality to the new Les Chenaux Regional County Municipality.
 The Parish of Saint-Maurice moved from the defunct Francheville Regional County Municipality to the new Les Chenaux Regional County Municipality.
 The Parish of Saint-Narcisse moved from the defunct Francheville Regional County Municipality to the new Les Chenaux Regional County Municipality.
 The Parish of Saint-Prosper (Mauricie) moved from the defunct Francheville Regional County Municipality to the new Les Chenaux Regional County Municipality.
 The Municipality of Saint-Stanislas (Mauricie) moved from the defunct Francheville Regional County Municipality to the new Les Chenaux Regional County Municipality.
 The Municipality of Sainte-Anne-de-la-Pérade moved from the defunct Francheville Regional County Municipality to the new Les Chenaux Regional County Municipality.
 The Parish of Sainte-Geneviève-de-Batiscan moved from the defunct Francheville Regional County Municipality to the new Les Chenaux Regional County Municipality.
 19 January: The Municipality of Saint-Elzéar changed its name to Saint-Elzéar-de-Témiscouata.
 18 February: Creation of the City of Saguenay by the merger of the City of Chicoutimi, the City of Jonquière, the City of La Baie, the City of Laterrière, the Municipality of Lac-Kénogami, the Municipality of Shipshaw and the Township of Tremblay.
 Le Fjord-du-Saguenay Regional County Municipality was altered in conjunction with the above, to exclude the parts that went into the new City of Saguenay.
 27 February:
 Creation of the Municipality of Deschambault-Grondines by the merger of the Municipality of Deschambault and the Municipality of Grondines.
 The Municipality of Saint-Agathe-Nord is annexed by the City of Sainte-Agathe-des-Monts.
 6 March: The Municipality of Colombourg is annexed by the City of Macamic.
 13 March: Creation of the City of Wright-Gracefield-Northfield by the merger of the Municipality of Northfield, the Village of Gracefield, the Township of Wright.
 24 April:
 The City of Saint-Timothée and the Municipality of Grande-Île are annexed by the City of Salaberry-de-Valleyfield.
 Creation of the Municipality of Grenville-sur-la-Rouge by the merger of the Village of Calumet and the Township of Grenville.
 27 April: The Municipality of Sainte-Luce-Luceville changed its name to Sainte-Luce.
 4 May: The City of Pabos changed its name to Chandler.
 1 June: The City of Le Gardeur is annexed by the City of Repentigny.
 4 July:
 Creation of the City of Métis-sur-Mer by the merger of the Village of Métis-sur-Mer and the Municipality of Les Boules.
 The Parish of Notre-Dame-de-Portneuf is annexed by the City of Portneuf.
 The Township of Sutton is annexed by the City of Sutton.
 6 July:
The Municipality of Brownsburg-Chatham became a City.
Annexation of the Unorganized Territory of Lac-Touradi to Saint-Eugène-de-Ladrière.
 24 July: Creation of the City of Cookshire-Eaton by the merger of the City of Cookshire, the Municipality of Eaton and the Township of Newport.
 11 September: Creation of the City of Saint-Sauveur by the merger of the Village of Saint-Sauveur-des-Monts and the Parish of Saint-Sauveur.
 21 September: The Parish of Laverlochère became a Municipality.
 9 October: The Village of Omerville and the Township of Magog are annexed by the City of Magog.
 10 October: Creation of the Municipality of Beaux-Rivages-Lac-des-Écorces-Val-Barrette by the merger of the Municipality of Beaux-Rivages, the Village of Lac-des-Écorces and the Village of Val-Barrette.
 18 December: Creation of the City of Rivière-Rouge by the merger of the Municipality of La Macaza, the Municipality of Marchand, the Village of L’Annonciation and the Village of Sainte-Véronique.

2003 
Thirty-one municipality modifications were approved in 2003.
 8 January: The Municipality of Des Ruisseaux and the Parish of Saint-Aimé-du-Lac-des-Îles are annexed by the City of Mont-Laurier.
 12 February:
The City of Moisie and the Municipality of Gallix are annexed by the City of Sept-Îles.
The Parish of Saint-Gédéon is annexed by the Municipality of Saint-Gédéon-de-Beauce.
 19 February: The Municipality of Rivière-Pentecôte is annexed by the City of Port-Cartier.
 22 February: The City of Wright-Gracefield-Northfield changed its name to Gracefield.
 28 February: The Parish of Saint-Pie is annexed by the City of Saint-Pie.
 26 March: The Municipality of La Bostonnais, The Municipality of La Croche, The Municipality of Lac-Édouard and the Village of Parent are annexed by the City of La Tuque.
 Le Haut-Saint-Maurice Regional County Municipality became defunct in conjunction with the above.
 5 April:
The Village of Saint-Boniface-de-Shawinigan became the Municipality of Saint-Boniface.
The Parish of Saint-Jean became the Municipality of Saint-Jean-de-l'Île-d'Orléans.
 13 April: The Quebec Liberal Party came to power in the 2003 Quebec election, with a campaign promise to allow voters a say in reversing some of the 2000–2003 municipal amalgamations undertaken by the previous Parti Québécois government (see 2000–2006 municipal reorganization in Quebec).
 21 June: The Municipality of Beaux-Rivages-Lac-des-Écorces-Val-Barrette changed its name to Lac-des-Écorces.
 19 July: the Parish of Saint-Jean-Baptiste became a Municipality.
 26 July: The Township of Grand-Calumet became a Municipality.
 2 August:
 The Village of Montebello became a Municipality.
 The Village of Shawville became a Municipality.
 The Parish of Notre-Dame-de-Bon-Secours became the Municipality of Notre-Dame-de-Bonsecours.
 The Township of Thorne became a Municipality.
 The United Townships of Mulgrave-et-Derry became a Municipality.
 11 October:
 The Village of Campbell's Bay became a Municipality.
 The Parish of Notre-Dame-de-la-Paix became a Municipality.
 The Parish of Saint-François-d'Assise became a Municipality.
 The Township of Clarendon became a Municipality.
 The Township of Denholm became a Municipality.
 The Township of Grand-Remous became a Municipality.
 The United Townships of Mansfield-et-Pontefract became a Municipality.
 The United Townships of Sheen-Esher-Aberdeen-et-Malakoff became the Municipality of Sheenboro.
 Vallée-de-l'Or Regional County Municipality changed its name to La Vallée-de-l'Or Regional County Municipality.
 13 December: The Parish of Saint-Alexis-de-Matapédia became a Municipality.
 20 December:
 The Village of Bryson became a Municipality.
 The Parish of Saint-François became the Municipality of Saint-François-de-l'Île-d'Orléans.
 The United Townships of Leslie-Clapham-et-Huddersfield became the Municipality of Otter Lake.

2004 
The process to de-merge some municipalities created in 2000–2003 began on May 16, 2004, through the collection of signatures to organize municipal referendums held on June 20. Some residents voted to de-merge and reconstitute their former municipalities, effective January 1, 2006. In the meantime, thirteen municipality modifications were approved in 2004.
 10 January: The Parish of Tingwick became a Municipality.
 31 January: The Municipality of Sainte-Anne-de-Portneuf changed its name to Portneuf-sur-Mer.
 7 February:
The Parish of Berthier-sur-Mer became a Municipality.
The United Townships of Alleyn-et-Cawood became a Municipality.
 20 March: The Municipality of Deleage changed (corrected) its name to Déléage.
 24 April: the Township of Bristol became a Municipality.
 12 June: the Village of Saint-Marc-des-Carrières became a City.
 7 July: The City of Saint-Nicéphore and the Municipality of Saint-Charles-de-Drummond are annexed by the City of Drummondville.
 8 September: 
The Inuit reserved land of Kuujjuarapik (not to be confused with the northern village of the same name) is created from territory taken from the Unorganized Territory of Baie-d'Hudson.
The Inuit reserved land of Umiujaq (not to be confused with the northern village of the same name) is created from territory taken from the Unorganized Territory of Baie-d'Hudson.
 6 November: 
The Municipality of Notre-Dame-de-l'Île-Perrot became a City.
The Township of Litchfield became a Municipality.
 27 November: The Municipality of Saint-Edmond changed its name to Saint-Edmond-les-Plaines.

2005 
Eight municipality modifications were approved in 2005.
 15 January: 
The Parish of Grande-Vallée became a Municipality.
The Parish of Saint-Élie became the Municipality of Saint-Élie-de-Caxton.
 23 April: The Municipality of Notre-Dame-des-Prairies became a City.
 7 May: The City of Carleton-Saint-Omer changed its name to Carleton-sur-Mer.
 18 June: The Parish of Saint-Julien became a Municipality.
 8 October: the Parish of Notre-Dame-de-Lourdes became a Municipality.
 31 October: The Unorganized Territory of Rivière-Kipawa is split into the Unorganized Territories of Laniel and Les Lacs-du-Témiscamingue.
 19 November: The Parish of Notre-Dame-du-Portage became a Municipality.

2006 
Thirty-four municipality modifications were approved in 2006.
 1 January:
 Re-Creation of the City of Baie-D'Urfé, the City of Beaconsfield, the City of Côte-Saint-Luc, the City of Dollard-des-Ormeaux, the City of Dorval, the City of Hampstead, the City of Kirkland, the City of L'Île-Dorval, the City of Mont-Royal, the City of Montréal-Est, the City of Montréal-Ouest, the City of Pointe-Claire, the City of Sainte-Anne-de-Bellevue, the City of Westmount and the Village of Senneville from territories taken from the City of Montréal.
 Re-Creation of the City of L'Ancienne-Lorette and the City of Saint-Augustin-de-Desmaures from territories taken from Quebec City.
 Re-Creation of the City of Boucherville, the City of Brossard, the City of Saint-Bruno-de-Montarville and the City of Saint-Lambert from territories taken from the City of Longueuil.
 Creation of the Municipality of Saint-Aimé-du-Lac-des-Îles from territories taken from the City of Mont-Laurier.
 Creation of the Municipality of Newport from territories taken from the City of Cookshire-Eaton.
 Re-Creation of the City of Estérel from territories taken from the City of Sainte-Marguerite-Estérel.
 The City of Sainte-Marguerite-Estérel changed its name to Sainte-Marguerite-du-Lac-Masson.
 Re-Creation of the Municipality of La Bostonnais and the Municipality Lac-Édouard from territories taken from the City of La Tuque.
 Re-Creation of the Municipality of Lac-Tremblant-Nord from territories taken from the City of Mont-Tremblant.
 Re-Creation of the Municipality of La Macaza from territories taken from the City of Rivière-Rouge.
 Re-Creation of the Municipality of Grosse-Île from territories taken from the Municipality of Les Îles-de-la-Madeleine.
 Creation of the Town of Ivry-sur-le-Lac from territories taken from the Town of Sainte-Agathe-des-Monts.
 22 March: Creation of the Municipality of Cacouna by the merger of the Village of Saint-Georges-de-Cacouna and the Parish of Saint-Georges-de-Cacouna.
 22 April: Asbestos Regional County Municipality changed its name to Les Sources Regional County Municipality.
 14 October: The Parish of Saint-Roch-de-l'Achigan became a Municipality.

2007 
Six municipality modifications were approved in 2007.
 1 January: The Township of Granby is annexed by the City of Granby.
 2 June: 
The Parish of L'Ange-Gardien became a Municipality.
The Parish of Sainte-Hélène became a Municipality.
 13 October: The Municipality of Coteau-du-Lac became a City.
 30 November: Creation of the territory equivalent to a regional county municipality (TE) of Eeyou Istchee from part of the existing TE of Jamésie.
 22 December: The Municipality of Grand-Calumet changed its name to L'Île-de-Grand-Calumet.

2008 
Sixteen municipality modifications were approved in 2008.
 2 February: The Parish of Sainte-Élizabeth-de-Warwick became a Municipality.
 3 May:
The Parish of Saint-Valentin became a Municipality.
The Township of Chester-Est became the Municipality of Sainte-Hélène-de-Chester.
 5 July: The Municipality of L'Île-de-Grand-Calumet changed (corrected) its name to L'Île-du-Grand-Calumet.
 13 September: The Village of East Farnham became a Municipality.
 27 September: 
The Parish of Saint-Stanislas-de-Kostka became a Municipality.
The Parish of Sainte-Anne-de-Sorel became a Municipality.
 11 October: 
The Parish of La Présentation became a Municipality.
The Parish of Sainte-Justine-de-Newton became a Municipality.
 18 October:
 The Parish of Saint-Ignace-de-Stanbridge became a Municipality.
 The Parish of Saint-Louis became a Municipality.
 The Parish of Sainte-Angèle-de-Monnoir became a Municipality.
 The Parish of Sainte-Sabine (Montérégie) became a Municipality.
 25 October: 
The Parish of Saint-Alphonse became the Municipality of Saint-Alphonse-de-Granby.
The Parish of Saint-Paul-d'Abbotsford became a Municipality.
 15 November: L'Amiante Regional County Municipality changed its name to Les Appalaches Regional County Municipality.

2009 
Twenty-two municipality modifications were approved in 2009.
 1 January: Le Bas-Richelieu Regional County Municipality changed its name to Pierre-De Saurel Regional County Municipality.
 17 January: The Parish of Saint-Colomban became a Municipality.
 14 March: The Parish of Saint-Louis-de-Blandford became a Municipality.
 21 March: The Township of Elgin became a Municipality.
 4 April:
 The Village of Napierville became a Municipality.
 The Village of Saint-Zotique became a Municipality.
 The Parish of Notre-Dame-de-Stanbridge became a Municipality.
 The Parish of Saint-Aimé became a Municipality.
 The Parish of Saint-Cyprien-de-Napierville became a Municipality.
 The Parish of Saint-David became a Municipality.
 The Parish of Saint-Robert became a Municipality.
 The Parish of Saint-Simon became a Municipality.
 The Parish of Sainte-Barbe became a Municipality.
 The Township of Saint-Valérien-de-Milton became a Municipality.
 The Township of Sainte-Cécile-de-Milton became a Municipality.
 23 May: The Indian reserve of Betsiamites changed its name to Pessamit.
 23 May: The Unorganized Territory of Chute-des-Passes changed its name to Passes-Dangereuses.
 27 June: The Parish of Saint-Paul-de-l'Île-aux-Noix became a Municipality.
 29 August: The Unorganized Territory of Lac-Fouillac is annexed to the Municipality of Rivière-Héva.
 16 September: The Municipality of Le Bic is annexed by the City of Rimouski.
 21 October: The Village of Norbertville is annexed by the Municipality of Saint-Norbert-d'Arthabaska.
 1 November: Elections were held in nearly all municipalities of Quebec.
 7 November: The Parish of Saint-Hippolyte became a Municipality.
 28 November: The Parish of Saint-Modeste became a Municipality.

2010 
Seventeen municipality modifications were approved in 2010.
 1 January: The City of Bromont moved from La Haute-Yamaska Regional County Municipality to Brome-Missisquoi Regional County Municipality.
 30 January: The Parish of Très-Saint-Rédempteur became a Municipality.
 6 February: The Parish of Sainte-Clotilde-de-Châteauguay became the Municipality of Sainte-Clotilde.
 27 February: The Parish of Matapédia became a Municipality.
 24 April: The Parish of Sainte-Victoire-de-Sorel became a Municipality.
 5 May: Creation of the City of Cabano-Notre-Dame-du-Lac by the merger of the City of Cabano and the City of Notre-Dame-du-Lac.
 8 May: The Cree village of Nemiscau changed its name to Nemaska.
 15 May: The Village of Howick became a Municipality.
 7 August: The Parish of Saint-Télesphore became a Municipality.
 7 July:
 The Equivalent territory of Basse-Côte-Nord became Le Golfe-du-Saint-Laurent Regional County Municipality.
 The Unorganized Territory of Petit-Mécatina moved from Minganie Regional County Municipality to Le Golfe-du-Saint-Laurent Regional County Municipality.
 4 September: The Parish of Saint-Prosper became the Municipality of Saint-Prosper-de-Champlain.
 30 October: The Municipality of Sainte-Marguerite changed its name to Sainte-Marguerite-Marie.
 13 November: 
The City of Cabano-Notre-Dame-du-Lac changed its name to Témiscouata-sur-le-Lac.
The Municipality of Saint-Colomban became a City.
The Parish of Courcelles became a Municipality. 
 11 December: The Parish of Saint-Édouard became a Municipality.

2011 
Thirteen municipality modifications were approved in 2011.
 12 February: Lajemmerais Regional County Municipality changed its name to Marguerite-D'Youville Regional County Municipality.
 26 February: The Parish of Saint-Onésime-d'Ixworth became a Municipality.
 14 May: The Parish of Saint-Jacques-le-Mineur became a Municipality.
 16 July: The Parish of Saint-Samuel became a Municipality.
 30 July: The Parish of Saint-Théodore-d'Acton became a Municipality.
 3 September: 
The Parish of Saint-Joachim-de-Shefford became a Municipality.
The Parish of Saint-Patrice-de-Sherrington became a Municipality.
 22 October: The Parish of Saint-Joseph-de-Ham-Sud became the Municipality of Ham-Sud.
 5 November:
The Parish of Saint-Sébastien became a Municipality. 
The Township of Hinchinbrooke became a Municipality.
 10 December: 
The Parish of Saint-Anicet became a Municipality.
The Parish of Saint-Michel became a Municipality.
The Parish of Saint-Rémi-de-Tingwick became a Municipality.

2012 
Eight municipality modifications were approved in 2012.
 18 February: The Parish of Saint-Nérée became the Municipality of Saint-Nérée-de-Bellechasse.
 5 May: The Municipality of Saint-Pierre-de-Véronne-à-Pike-River changed its name to Pike River.
 30 June: The Parish of Saint-Lucien became a Municipality.
 17 November: 
The Parish of Saint-Denis-de-Brompton became a Municipality.
The Parish of Saint-Ignace-de-Loyola became a Municipality.
The Parish of Sainte-Geneviève-de-Berthier became a Municipality.
 8 December: The Municipality of Sainte-Brigitte-de-Laval became a City.
 19 December: Creation of the Municipality of Saint-Alexis by the merger of the Village of Saint-Alexis and the Parish of Saint-Alexis.

2013 
Five municipality modifications were approved in 2013.
 19 January: The Parish of Sainte-Élisabeth became a Municipality.
 9 March: Matane Regional County Municipality changed its name to La Matanie Regional County Municipality.
 22 June: The Parish of Saint-Lambert-de-Lauzon became a Municipality.
 16 November: 
The Parish of Saint-Denis became the Municipality of Saint-Denis-De La Bouteillerie
The Parish of Saint-François-Xavier-de-Brompton became a Municipality.

2014 
Eight municipality modifications were approved in 2014.
 1 January: The Municipality of Baie-James changed its name to Eeyou Istchee Baie-James.
 14 June: The Parish of Saint-Gabriel-de-Brandon became a Municipality.
 13 September: The Municipality of  Sainte-Hélène changed its name to Sainte-Hélène-de-Kamouraska.
 1 November: 
The Parish of Saint-Antonin became a Municipality.
The Parish of Saint-Michel-du-Squatec became a Municipality.
 6 December: 
The Parish of Calixa-Lavallée became a Municipality.
The Parish of Saint-Ambroise-de-Kildare became a Municipality.
The Parish of Saint-Justin became a Municipality.

2015 
Three municipality modifications were approved in 2015.
 20 June: 
The Parish of Val-Racine became a Municipality.
The Township of Maddington became the Municipality of Maddington Falls.
 22 August: The Municipality of Rigaud became a City.

2016 
Eight municipality modifications were approved in 2016.
 9 January: The Municipality of Saint-Honoré became a City.
 9 March: The Municipality of Sainte-Anne-du-Sault is annexed by the City of Daveluyville.
 19 March: The Parish of Saint-Côme became a Municipality.
 18 June: The Township of Natashquan became a Municipality.
 24 September: The Parish of Saint-Gilles became a Municipality.
 22 October: The Municipality of Saint-Philippe became a City.
 5 November: The Parish of Saint-Clément became a Municipality.
 10 December: The Parish of Saint-Marie-Salomé became a Municipality.

2017 
Six municipality modifications were approved in 2017.
 13 May: The Parish of Saint-Liguori became a Municipality.
 20 May: The Municipality of Shannon became a City.
 3 June: The Parish of Saint-Bernard-de-Lacolle became a Municipality.
 20 June: The Parish of Sainte-Famille became the Municipality of Sainte-Famille-de-l’Île-d’Orléans.
 27 December: Creation of the Municipality of Laverlochère-Angliers by the merger of the Municipality of Laverlochère and the Village of Angliers.

2018 
Two municipality modifications were approved in 2018.
 10 February: The Parish of Sainte-Ursule became a Municipality.
 23 May: The Parish of L'Épiphanie is annexed by the City of L'Épiphanie.

2019 
Two municipality modifications were approved in 2019.
 21 September: The Municipality of Saint-Charles-Borromée became a City.
 12 November: The Municipality of Saint-Amable became a City.

2020 
Four municipality modifications were approved in 2020.
 4 January: The Municipality of Saint-Roch-des-Aulnets changed its name to Saint-Roch-des-Aulnaies.
 21 March: The Parish of Saint-Simon became the Municipality of Saint-Simon-de-Rimouski.
 30 May: The Parish of Saint-Mathieu-de-Rioux became a Municipality.
 12 December: The Municipality of Saint-André changed its name to Saint-André-de-Kamouraska.

2021 
Seven municipality modifications were approved in 2021.
 2 January: The City of Asbestos changed its name to Val-des-Sources.
 17 April: The Parish of Saints-Anges became a Municipality.
 19 June: The Parish of Saint-Irénée became a Municipality.
 28 July: The Regional County Municipalities of Brome-Missisquoi and La Haute-Yamaska moved from the Montérégie region to the Estrie region.
 18 September: The Parish of Saint-Paul-de-la-Croix became a Municipality.
 4 December: The Municipality of Saint-Antonin became a City.
 18 December: The Parish of Saint-Germain became the Municipality of Saint-Germain-de-Kamouraska.

2022 
Three municipality modifications have been approved to date in 2022.
 1 January: The Municipality of Notre-Dame-de-la-Salette moved from Les Collines-de-l'Outaouais Regional County Municipality to Papineau Regional County Municipality.
 29 January: The Municipality of Saint-Faustin-Lac-Carré changed its name to Mont-Blanc.
 30 July: Robert-Cliche Regional County Municipality changed its name to Beauce-Centre Regional County Municipality.
 3 September: The Parish of Saint-Edmond-de-Grantham became a Municipality.
 22 October The Municipality of Saint-Georges-de-Clarenceville changed its name to Clarenceville.
 3 December: The Parish of Saint-Odilon-de-Cranbourne became a Municipality.
 21 December: Creation of the Municipality of La Morandière-Rochebaucourt by the merger of the Municipality of La Morandière and the Municipality of Rochebaucourt.

See also 
 List of municipalities in Quebec
 2000–2006 municipal reorganization in Quebec
 2002–2006 municipal reorganization of Montreal
 2004 Quebec municipal referendums

References

External links 
 Institut de la statistique du Québec: Documents de référence
 Modifications aux municipalités du Québec (Bulletin annuel)
 Modifications aux municipalités du Québec (Bulletin mensuel)
 Modifications aux municipalités depuis le 1er janvier 1991
 Commission de toponymie du Québec
 Historique des modifications aux municipalités du Québec: Période 1961-1990
 Paroisses et municipalités de la région de Montréal au XIXe siècle, 1825-1861

Local government in Quebec
Political history of Quebec